

289001–289100 

|-bgcolor=#d6d6d6
| 289001 ||  || — || October 6, 2004 || Kitt Peak || Spacewatch || HYG || align=right | 3.4 km || 
|-id=002 bgcolor=#d6d6d6
| 289002 ||  || — || October 6, 2004 || Kitt Peak || Spacewatch || — || align=right | 3.6 km || 
|-id=003 bgcolor=#fefefe
| 289003 ||  || — || October 6, 2004 || Palomar || NEAT || V || align=right data-sort-value="0.98" | 980 m || 
|-id=004 bgcolor=#fefefe
| 289004 ||  || — || October 7, 2004 || Anderson Mesa || LONEOS || FLO || align=right data-sort-value="0.98" | 980 m || 
|-id=005 bgcolor=#d6d6d6
| 289005 ||  || — || October 4, 2004 || Anderson Mesa || LONEOS || — || align=right | 4.0 km || 
|-id=006 bgcolor=#fefefe
| 289006 ||  || — || October 5, 2004 || Kitt Peak || Spacewatch || NYS || align=right data-sort-value="0.49" | 490 m || 
|-id=007 bgcolor=#fefefe
| 289007 ||  || — || October 5, 2004 || Kitt Peak || Spacewatch || — || align=right data-sort-value="0.89" | 890 m || 
|-id=008 bgcolor=#d6d6d6
| 289008 ||  || — || October 5, 2004 || Kitt Peak || Spacewatch || — || align=right | 3.4 km || 
|-id=009 bgcolor=#E9E9E9
| 289009 ||  || — || October 5, 2004 || Kitt Peak || Spacewatch || — || align=right | 2.6 km || 
|-id=010 bgcolor=#E9E9E9
| 289010 ||  || — || October 5, 2004 || Kitt Peak || Spacewatch || — || align=right data-sort-value="0.87" | 870 m || 
|-id=011 bgcolor=#fefefe
| 289011 ||  || — || October 6, 2004 || Kitt Peak || Spacewatch || MAS || align=right data-sort-value="0.86" | 860 m || 
|-id=012 bgcolor=#d6d6d6
| 289012 ||  || — || October 7, 2004 || Anderson Mesa || LONEOS || — || align=right | 4.6 km || 
|-id=013 bgcolor=#fefefe
| 289013 ||  || — || October 7, 2004 || Anderson Mesa || LONEOS || — || align=right data-sort-value="0.84" | 840 m || 
|-id=014 bgcolor=#d6d6d6
| 289014 ||  || — || October 7, 2004 || Kitt Peak || Spacewatch || — || align=right | 2.4 km || 
|-id=015 bgcolor=#fefefe
| 289015 ||  || — || October 7, 2004 || Socorro || LINEAR || — || align=right | 1.1 km || 
|-id=016 bgcolor=#d6d6d6
| 289016 ||  || — || October 7, 2004 || Kitt Peak || Spacewatch || — || align=right | 2.9 km || 
|-id=017 bgcolor=#fefefe
| 289017 ||  || — || October 7, 2004 || Kitt Peak || Spacewatch || NYS || align=right data-sort-value="0.91" | 910 m || 
|-id=018 bgcolor=#fefefe
| 289018 ||  || — || October 7, 2004 || Palomar || NEAT || — || align=right | 1.1 km || 
|-id=019 bgcolor=#d6d6d6
| 289019 ||  || — || October 8, 2004 || Kitt Peak || Spacewatch || EOS || align=right | 3.0 km || 
|-id=020 bgcolor=#fefefe
| 289020 Ukmerge ||  ||  || October 12, 2004 || Moletai || K. Černis || CLA || align=right | 2.8 km || 
|-id=021 bgcolor=#d6d6d6
| 289021 Juzeliunas ||  ||  || October 12, 2004 || Moletai || K. Černis, J. Zdanavičius || — || align=right | 4.0 km || 
|-id=022 bgcolor=#FA8072
| 289022 ||  || — || October 9, 2004 || Socorro || LINEAR || — || align=right | 2.0 km || 
|-id=023 bgcolor=#fefefe
| 289023 ||  || — || October 4, 2004 || Anderson Mesa || LONEOS || V || align=right data-sort-value="0.92" | 920 m || 
|-id=024 bgcolor=#fefefe
| 289024 ||  || — || October 4, 2004 || Anderson Mesa || LONEOS || — || align=right | 1.3 km || 
|-id=025 bgcolor=#E9E9E9
| 289025 ||  || — || October 6, 2004 || Palomar || NEAT || — || align=right | 2.9 km || 
|-id=026 bgcolor=#fefefe
| 289026 ||  || — || October 6, 2004 || Palomar || NEAT || — || align=right | 1.1 km || 
|-id=027 bgcolor=#d6d6d6
| 289027 ||  || — || October 6, 2004 || Palomar || NEAT || — || align=right | 4.0 km || 
|-id=028 bgcolor=#fefefe
| 289028 ||  || — || October 7, 2004 || Anderson Mesa || LONEOS || — || align=right | 1.0 km || 
|-id=029 bgcolor=#E9E9E9
| 289029 ||  || — || October 7, 2004 || Socorro || LINEAR || — || align=right | 1.6 km || 
|-id=030 bgcolor=#d6d6d6
| 289030 ||  || — || October 7, 2004 || Socorro || LINEAR || — || align=right | 5.1 km || 
|-id=031 bgcolor=#fefefe
| 289031 ||  || — || October 7, 2004 || Socorro || LINEAR || — || align=right data-sort-value="0.88" | 880 m || 
|-id=032 bgcolor=#d6d6d6
| 289032 ||  || — || October 7, 2004 || Socorro || LINEAR || — || align=right | 4.8 km || 
|-id=033 bgcolor=#d6d6d6
| 289033 ||  || — || October 7, 2004 || Anderson Mesa || LONEOS || LIX || align=right | 5.1 km || 
|-id=034 bgcolor=#FA8072
| 289034 ||  || — || October 7, 2004 || Anderson Mesa || LONEOS || — || align=right | 1.3 km || 
|-id=035 bgcolor=#d6d6d6
| 289035 ||  || — || October 8, 2004 || Anderson Mesa || LONEOS || 7:4 || align=right | 5.0 km || 
|-id=036 bgcolor=#E9E9E9
| 289036 ||  || — || October 8, 2004 || Anderson Mesa || LONEOS || — || align=right | 1.9 km || 
|-id=037 bgcolor=#fefefe
| 289037 ||  || — || October 8, 2004 || Anderson Mesa || LONEOS || V || align=right | 1.1 km || 
|-id=038 bgcolor=#d6d6d6
| 289038 ||  || — || October 9, 2004 || Anderson Mesa || LONEOS || EOS || align=right | 2.6 km || 
|-id=039 bgcolor=#E9E9E9
| 289039 ||  || — || October 4, 2004 || Kitt Peak || Spacewatch || — || align=right | 2.1 km || 
|-id=040 bgcolor=#d6d6d6
| 289040 ||  || — || October 5, 2004 || Kitt Peak || Spacewatch || — || align=right | 3.9 km || 
|-id=041 bgcolor=#d6d6d6
| 289041 ||  || — || October 5, 2004 || Kitt Peak || Spacewatch || — || align=right | 3.3 km || 
|-id=042 bgcolor=#d6d6d6
| 289042 ||  || — || October 6, 2004 || Kitt Peak || Spacewatch || THM || align=right | 2.3 km || 
|-id=043 bgcolor=#fefefe
| 289043 ||  || — || October 6, 2004 || Kitt Peak || Spacewatch || — || align=right data-sort-value="0.76" | 760 m || 
|-id=044 bgcolor=#d6d6d6
| 289044 ||  || — || October 6, 2004 || Kitt Peak || Spacewatch || — || align=right | 3.4 km || 
|-id=045 bgcolor=#fefefe
| 289045 ||  || — || October 6, 2004 || Kitt Peak || Spacewatch || ERI || align=right | 3.3 km || 
|-id=046 bgcolor=#fefefe
| 289046 ||  || — || October 6, 2004 || Kitt Peak || Spacewatch || V || align=right data-sort-value="0.69" | 690 m || 
|-id=047 bgcolor=#d6d6d6
| 289047 ||  || — || October 6, 2004 || Kitt Peak || Spacewatch || — || align=right | 2.4 km || 
|-id=048 bgcolor=#fefefe
| 289048 ||  || — || October 7, 2004 || Socorro || LINEAR || V || align=right | 1.1 km || 
|-id=049 bgcolor=#fefefe
| 289049 ||  || — || October 7, 2004 || Socorro || LINEAR || — || align=right data-sort-value="0.95" | 950 m || 
|-id=050 bgcolor=#d6d6d6
| 289050 ||  || — || October 8, 2004 || Socorro || LINEAR || — || align=right | 4.7 km || 
|-id=051 bgcolor=#fefefe
| 289051 ||  || — || October 9, 2004 || Socorro || LINEAR || — || align=right | 1.1 km || 
|-id=052 bgcolor=#d6d6d6
| 289052 ||  || — || October 4, 2004 || Kitt Peak || Spacewatch || — || align=right | 4.0 km || 
|-id=053 bgcolor=#d6d6d6
| 289053 ||  || — || October 7, 2004 || Kitt Peak || Spacewatch || — || align=right | 3.5 km || 
|-id=054 bgcolor=#d6d6d6
| 289054 ||  || — || October 7, 2004 || Kitt Peak || Spacewatch || — || align=right | 3.0 km || 
|-id=055 bgcolor=#E9E9E9
| 289055 ||  || — || October 7, 2004 || Kitt Peak || Spacewatch || — || align=right | 1.4 km || 
|-id=056 bgcolor=#fefefe
| 289056 ||  || — || October 7, 2004 || Kitt Peak || Spacewatch || V || align=right data-sort-value="0.79" | 790 m || 
|-id=057 bgcolor=#d6d6d6
| 289057 ||  || — || October 7, 2004 || Kitt Peak || Spacewatch || — || align=right | 2.4 km || 
|-id=058 bgcolor=#fefefe
| 289058 ||  || — || October 7, 2004 || Kitt Peak || Spacewatch || MAS || align=right data-sort-value="0.73" | 730 m || 
|-id=059 bgcolor=#d6d6d6
| 289059 ||  || — || October 7, 2004 || Kitt Peak || Spacewatch || LIX || align=right | 5.5 km || 
|-id=060 bgcolor=#E9E9E9
| 289060 ||  || — || October 7, 2004 || Kitt Peak || Spacewatch || — || align=right | 3.8 km || 
|-id=061 bgcolor=#d6d6d6
| 289061 ||  || — || October 7, 2004 || Kitt Peak || Spacewatch || — || align=right | 3.4 km || 
|-id=062 bgcolor=#fefefe
| 289062 ||  || — || October 7, 2004 || Kitt Peak || Spacewatch || — || align=right | 1.2 km || 
|-id=063 bgcolor=#d6d6d6
| 289063 ||  || — || October 7, 2004 || Kitt Peak || Spacewatch || — || align=right | 3.5 km || 
|-id=064 bgcolor=#d6d6d6
| 289064 ||  || — || October 7, 2004 || Kitt Peak || Spacewatch || — || align=right | 3.0 km || 
|-id=065 bgcolor=#fefefe
| 289065 ||  || — || October 7, 2004 || Kitt Peak || Spacewatch || — || align=right | 1.1 km || 
|-id=066 bgcolor=#fefefe
| 289066 ||  || — || October 7, 2004 || Kitt Peak || Spacewatch || NYS || align=right data-sort-value="0.86" | 860 m || 
|-id=067 bgcolor=#fefefe
| 289067 ||  || — || October 8, 2004 || Kitt Peak || Spacewatch || NYS || align=right data-sort-value="0.83" | 830 m || 
|-id=068 bgcolor=#d6d6d6
| 289068 ||  || — || October 8, 2004 || Kitt Peak || Spacewatch || — || align=right | 4.2 km || 
|-id=069 bgcolor=#fefefe
| 289069 ||  || — || October 8, 2004 || Kitt Peak || Spacewatch || MAS || align=right data-sort-value="0.98" | 980 m || 
|-id=070 bgcolor=#E9E9E9
| 289070 ||  || — || October 8, 2004 || Kitt Peak || Spacewatch || — || align=right | 1.3 km || 
|-id=071 bgcolor=#E9E9E9
| 289071 ||  || — || October 8, 2004 || Kitt Peak || Spacewatch || — || align=right | 2.4 km || 
|-id=072 bgcolor=#E9E9E9
| 289072 ||  || — || October 8, 2004 || Kitt Peak || Spacewatch || — || align=right | 2.2 km || 
|-id=073 bgcolor=#fefefe
| 289073 ||  || — || October 8, 2004 || Kitt Peak || Spacewatch || — || align=right | 1.2 km || 
|-id=074 bgcolor=#d6d6d6
| 289074 ||  || — || October 8, 2004 || Kitt Peak || Spacewatch || THM || align=right | 2.7 km || 
|-id=075 bgcolor=#d6d6d6
| 289075 ||  || — || October 8, 2004 || Kitt Peak || Spacewatch || — || align=right | 2.7 km || 
|-id=076 bgcolor=#d6d6d6
| 289076 ||  || — || October 9, 2004 || Kitt Peak || Spacewatch || — || align=right | 2.8 km || 
|-id=077 bgcolor=#d6d6d6
| 289077 ||  || — || October 5, 2004 || Kitt Peak || Spacewatch || HYG || align=right | 3.0 km || 
|-id=078 bgcolor=#d6d6d6
| 289078 ||  || — || October 7, 2004 || Kitt Peak || Spacewatch || — || align=right | 3.0 km || 
|-id=079 bgcolor=#fefefe
| 289079 ||  || — || October 9, 2004 || Socorro || LINEAR || FLO || align=right data-sort-value="0.93" | 930 m || 
|-id=080 bgcolor=#E9E9E9
| 289080 ||  || — || October 9, 2004 || Kitt Peak || Spacewatch || — || align=right | 3.4 km || 
|-id=081 bgcolor=#fefefe
| 289081 ||  || — || October 10, 2004 || Socorro || LINEAR || V || align=right data-sort-value="0.88" | 880 m || 
|-id=082 bgcolor=#fefefe
| 289082 ||  || — || October 10, 2004 || Socorro || LINEAR || V || align=right data-sort-value="0.75" | 750 m || 
|-id=083 bgcolor=#d6d6d6
| 289083 ||  || — || October 6, 2004 || Socorro || LINEAR || — || align=right | 4.3 km || 
|-id=084 bgcolor=#E9E9E9
| 289084 ||  || — || October 6, 2004 || Socorro || LINEAR || — || align=right | 1.5 km || 
|-id=085 bgcolor=#fefefe
| 289085 Andreweil ||  ||  || October 6, 2004 || Saint-Sulpice || Saint-Sulpice Obs. || FLO || align=right data-sort-value="0.74" | 740 m || 
|-id=086 bgcolor=#d6d6d6
| 289086 ||  || — || October 9, 2004 || Kitt Peak || Spacewatch || — || align=right | 3.1 km || 
|-id=087 bgcolor=#fefefe
| 289087 ||  || — || October 9, 2004 || Palomar || NEAT || — || align=right | 1.4 km || 
|-id=088 bgcolor=#fefefe
| 289088 ||  || — || October 9, 2004 || Kitt Peak || Spacewatch || NYS || align=right data-sort-value="0.81" | 810 m || 
|-id=089 bgcolor=#E9E9E9
| 289089 ||  || — || October 9, 2004 || Kitt Peak || Spacewatch || ADE || align=right | 2.1 km || 
|-id=090 bgcolor=#d6d6d6
| 289090 ||  || — || October 9, 2004 || Kitt Peak || Spacewatch || — || align=right | 3.0 km || 
|-id=091 bgcolor=#d6d6d6
| 289091 ||  || — || October 9, 2004 || Kitt Peak || Spacewatch || — || align=right | 3.8 km || 
|-id=092 bgcolor=#fefefe
| 289092 ||  || — || October 9, 2004 || Kitt Peak || Spacewatch || MAS || align=right data-sort-value="0.74" | 740 m || 
|-id=093 bgcolor=#fefefe
| 289093 ||  || — || October 9, 2004 || Kitt Peak || Spacewatch || NYS || align=right data-sort-value="0.64" | 640 m || 
|-id=094 bgcolor=#E9E9E9
| 289094 ||  || — || October 9, 2004 || Kitt Peak || Spacewatch || — || align=right data-sort-value="0.81" | 810 m || 
|-id=095 bgcolor=#d6d6d6
| 289095 ||  || — || October 9, 2004 || Kitt Peak || Spacewatch || HYG || align=right | 3.4 km || 
|-id=096 bgcolor=#fefefe
| 289096 ||  || — || October 10, 2004 || Kitt Peak || Spacewatch || NYS || align=right data-sort-value="0.90" | 900 m || 
|-id=097 bgcolor=#fefefe
| 289097 ||  || — || October 10, 2004 || Kitt Peak || Spacewatch || V || align=right | 1.0 km || 
|-id=098 bgcolor=#fefefe
| 289098 ||  || — || October 12, 2004 || Kitt Peak || Spacewatch || — || align=right data-sort-value="0.81" | 810 m || 
|-id=099 bgcolor=#fefefe
| 289099 ||  || — || October 8, 2004 || Socorro || LINEAR || — || align=right | 1.1 km || 
|-id=100 bgcolor=#fefefe
| 289100 ||  || — || October 9, 2004 || Socorro || LINEAR || MAS || align=right data-sort-value="0.96" | 960 m || 
|}

289101–289200 

|-bgcolor=#fefefe
| 289101 ||  || — || October 10, 2004 || Kitt Peak || Spacewatch || V || align=right data-sort-value="0.85" | 850 m || 
|-id=102 bgcolor=#d6d6d6
| 289102 ||  || — || October 10, 2004 || Socorro || LINEAR || EOS || align=right | 1.9 km || 
|-id=103 bgcolor=#fefefe
| 289103 ||  || — || October 10, 2004 || Socorro || LINEAR || — || align=right | 1.2 km || 
|-id=104 bgcolor=#fefefe
| 289104 ||  || — || October 10, 2004 || Kitt Peak || Spacewatch || NYS || align=right data-sort-value="0.73" | 730 m || 
|-id=105 bgcolor=#d6d6d6
| 289105 ||  || — || October 10, 2004 || Socorro || LINEAR || EOS || align=right | 3.0 km || 
|-id=106 bgcolor=#fefefe
| 289106 ||  || — || October 11, 2004 || Kitt Peak || Spacewatch || — || align=right | 1.3 km || 
|-id=107 bgcolor=#fefefe
| 289107 ||  || — || October 11, 2004 || Kitt Peak || Spacewatch || — || align=right | 1.1 km || 
|-id=108 bgcolor=#d6d6d6
| 289108 ||  || — || October 14, 2004 || Palomar || NEAT || — || align=right | 4.9 km || 
|-id=109 bgcolor=#d6d6d6
| 289109 ||  || — || October 3, 2004 || Palomar || NEAT || — || align=right | 4.9 km || 
|-id=110 bgcolor=#E9E9E9
| 289110 ||  || — || October 10, 2004 || Kitt Peak || Spacewatch || WIT || align=right | 1.3 km || 
|-id=111 bgcolor=#d6d6d6
| 289111 ||  || — || October 11, 2004 || Palomar || NEAT || — || align=right | 4.3 km || 
|-id=112 bgcolor=#fefefe
| 289112 ||  || — || October 15, 2004 || Anderson Mesa || LONEOS || — || align=right | 1.2 km || 
|-id=113 bgcolor=#d6d6d6
| 289113 ||  || — || October 15, 2004 || Kitt Peak || Spacewatch || SHU3:2 || align=right | 9.6 km || 
|-id=114 bgcolor=#E9E9E9
| 289114 ||  || — || October 15, 2004 || Kitt Peak || Spacewatch || — || align=right | 1.3 km || 
|-id=115 bgcolor=#d6d6d6
| 289115 ||  || — || October 4, 2004 || Kitt Peak || Spacewatch || THM || align=right | 2.4 km || 
|-id=116 bgcolor=#fefefe
| 289116 Zurbuchen ||  ||  || October 11, 2004 || Kitt Peak || M. W. Buie || ERI || align=right | 3.1 km || 
|-id=117 bgcolor=#E9E9E9
| 289117 ||  || — || October 7, 2004 || Socorro || LINEAR || — || align=right | 3.5 km || 
|-id=118 bgcolor=#d6d6d6
| 289118 ||  || — || October 14, 2004 || Anderson Mesa || LONEOS || — || align=right | 3.7 km || 
|-id=119 bgcolor=#d6d6d6
| 289119 ||  || — || October 7, 2004 || Kitt Peak || Spacewatch || 3:2 || align=right | 4.7 km || 
|-id=120 bgcolor=#fefefe
| 289120 ||  || — || October 11, 2004 || Kitt Peak || Spacewatch || — || align=right data-sort-value="0.73" | 730 m || 
|-id=121 bgcolor=#fefefe
| 289121 Druskininkai ||  ||  || October 12, 2004 || Moletai || K. Černis, J. Zdanavičius || — || align=right | 1.1 km || 
|-id=122 bgcolor=#fefefe
| 289122 ||  || — || October 6, 2004 || Kitt Peak || Spacewatch || — || align=right data-sort-value="0.72" | 720 m || 
|-id=123 bgcolor=#fefefe
| 289123 ||  || — || October 16, 2004 || Socorro || LINEAR || H || align=right data-sort-value="0.74" | 740 m || 
|-id=124 bgcolor=#d6d6d6
| 289124 ||  || — || October 17, 2004 || Pla D'Arguines || R. Ferrando || THB || align=right | 4.7 km || 
|-id=125 bgcolor=#fefefe
| 289125 ||  || — || October 18, 2004 || Socorro || LINEAR || V || align=right | 1.0 km || 
|-id=126 bgcolor=#E9E9E9
| 289126 ||  || — || October 18, 2004 || Socorro || LINEAR || DOR || align=right | 3.4 km || 
|-id=127 bgcolor=#d6d6d6
| 289127 ||  || — || October 16, 2004 || Socorro || LINEAR || URS || align=right | 3.8 km || 
|-id=128 bgcolor=#fefefe
| 289128 ||  || — || October 20, 2004 || Socorro || LINEAR || NYS || align=right data-sort-value="0.75" | 750 m || 
|-id=129 bgcolor=#fefefe
| 289129 ||  || — || October 20, 2004 || Socorro || LINEAR || FLO || align=right data-sort-value="0.87" | 870 m || 
|-id=130 bgcolor=#d6d6d6
| 289130 ||  || — || October 21, 2004 || Socorro || LINEAR || — || align=right | 4.0 km || 
|-id=131 bgcolor=#fefefe
| 289131 ||  || — || October 21, 2004 || Socorro || LINEAR || — || align=right | 1.2 km || 
|-id=132 bgcolor=#d6d6d6
| 289132 ||  || — || October 21, 2004 || Socorro || LINEAR || — || align=right | 3.1 km || 
|-id=133 bgcolor=#E9E9E9
| 289133 ||  || — || October 23, 2004 || Socorro || LINEAR || MAR || align=right | 1.3 km || 
|-id=134 bgcolor=#fefefe
| 289134 ||  || — || November 2, 2004 || Anderson Mesa || LONEOS || — || align=right | 1.4 km || 
|-id=135 bgcolor=#fefefe
| 289135 ||  || — || November 3, 2004 || Kitt Peak || Spacewatch || NYS || align=right data-sort-value="0.87" | 870 m || 
|-id=136 bgcolor=#d6d6d6
| 289136 ||  || — || November 3, 2004 || Kitt Peak || Spacewatch || 7:4 || align=right | 5.5 km || 
|-id=137 bgcolor=#fefefe
| 289137 ||  || — || November 3, 2004 || Anderson Mesa || LONEOS || — || align=right data-sort-value="0.97" | 970 m || 
|-id=138 bgcolor=#fefefe
| 289138 ||  || — || November 3, 2004 || Kitt Peak || Spacewatch || NYS || align=right data-sort-value="0.81" | 810 m || 
|-id=139 bgcolor=#fefefe
| 289139 ||  || — || November 3, 2004 || Kitt Peak || Spacewatch || — || align=right | 1.2 km || 
|-id=140 bgcolor=#fefefe
| 289140 ||  || — || November 3, 2004 || Kitt Peak || Spacewatch || — || align=right data-sort-value="0.85" | 850 m || 
|-id=141 bgcolor=#fefefe
| 289141 ||  || — || November 3, 2004 || Anderson Mesa || LONEOS || — || align=right | 1.1 km || 
|-id=142 bgcolor=#d6d6d6
| 289142 ||  || — || November 3, 2004 || Anderson Mesa || LONEOS || 3:2 || align=right | 5.9 km || 
|-id=143 bgcolor=#d6d6d6
| 289143 ||  || — || November 3, 2004 || Palomar || NEAT || SHU3:2 || align=right | 11 km || 
|-id=144 bgcolor=#fefefe
| 289144 ||  || — || November 3, 2004 || Palomar || NEAT || — || align=right | 1.1 km || 
|-id=145 bgcolor=#d6d6d6
| 289145 ||  || — || November 4, 2004 || Catalina || CSS || HYG || align=right | 5.1 km || 
|-id=146 bgcolor=#fefefe
| 289146 ||  || — || November 4, 2004 || Catalina || CSS || — || align=right data-sort-value="0.83" | 830 m || 
|-id=147 bgcolor=#d6d6d6
| 289147 ||  || — || November 5, 2004 || Needville || J. Dellinger, P. Garossino || TIR || align=right | 3.4 km || 
|-id=148 bgcolor=#fefefe
| 289148 ||  || — || November 3, 2004 || Kitt Peak || Spacewatch || — || align=right | 1.2 km || 
|-id=149 bgcolor=#fefefe
| 289149 ||  || — || November 4, 2004 || Kitt Peak || Spacewatch || MAS || align=right data-sort-value="0.98" | 980 m || 
|-id=150 bgcolor=#d6d6d6
| 289150 ||  || — || November 4, 2004 || Catalina || CSS || EOS || align=right | 2.7 km || 
|-id=151 bgcolor=#fefefe
| 289151 ||  || — || November 4, 2004 || Catalina || CSS || NYS || align=right data-sort-value="0.79" | 790 m || 
|-id=152 bgcolor=#fefefe
| 289152 ||  || — || November 4, 2004 || Catalina || CSS || V || align=right | 1.0 km || 
|-id=153 bgcolor=#fefefe
| 289153 ||  || — || November 4, 2004 || Anderson Mesa || LONEOS || V || align=right data-sort-value="0.87" | 870 m || 
|-id=154 bgcolor=#d6d6d6
| 289154 ||  || — || November 4, 2004 || Anderson Mesa || LONEOS || — || align=right | 2.7 km || 
|-id=155 bgcolor=#fefefe
| 289155 ||  || — || November 4, 2004 || Anderson Mesa || LONEOS || EUT || align=right data-sort-value="0.81" | 810 m || 
|-id=156 bgcolor=#E9E9E9
| 289156 ||  || — || November 4, 2004 || Anderson Mesa || LONEOS || JUN || align=right | 1.1 km || 
|-id=157 bgcolor=#d6d6d6
| 289157 ||  || — || November 4, 2004 || Kitt Peak || Spacewatch || — || align=right | 4.4 km || 
|-id=158 bgcolor=#d6d6d6
| 289158 ||  || — || November 4, 2004 || Catalina || CSS || — || align=right | 4.5 km || 
|-id=159 bgcolor=#d6d6d6
| 289159 ||  || — || November 4, 2004 || Catalina || CSS || EUP || align=right | 4.7 km || 
|-id=160 bgcolor=#d6d6d6
| 289160 ||  || — || November 3, 2004 || Kitt Peak || Spacewatch || — || align=right | 3.9 km || 
|-id=161 bgcolor=#fefefe
| 289161 ||  || — || November 3, 2004 || Kitt Peak || Spacewatch || MAS || align=right data-sort-value="0.84" | 840 m || 
|-id=162 bgcolor=#E9E9E9
| 289162 ||  || — || November 4, 2004 || Kitt Peak || Spacewatch || AGN || align=right | 1.3 km || 
|-id=163 bgcolor=#d6d6d6
| 289163 ||  || — || November 4, 2004 || Kitt Peak || Spacewatch || — || align=right | 2.1 km || 
|-id=164 bgcolor=#fefefe
| 289164 ||  || — || November 4, 2004 || Kitt Peak || Spacewatch || NYS || align=right data-sort-value="0.77" | 770 m || 
|-id=165 bgcolor=#d6d6d6
| 289165 ||  || — || November 4, 2004 || Kitt Peak || Spacewatch || EUP || align=right | 4.6 km || 
|-id=166 bgcolor=#fefefe
| 289166 ||  || — || November 4, 2004 || Catalina || CSS || FLO || align=right | 1.1 km || 
|-id=167 bgcolor=#fefefe
| 289167 ||  || — || November 10, 2004 || Desert Eagle || W. K. Y. Yeung || NYS || align=right data-sort-value="0.92" | 920 m || 
|-id=168 bgcolor=#fefefe
| 289168 ||  || — || November 4, 2004 || Catalina || CSS || — || align=right | 1.3 km || 
|-id=169 bgcolor=#fefefe
| 289169 ||  || — || November 9, 2004 || Catalina || CSS || — || align=right data-sort-value="0.91" | 910 m || 
|-id=170 bgcolor=#E9E9E9
| 289170 ||  || — || November 9, 2004 || Catalina || CSS || — || align=right | 4.3 km || 
|-id=171 bgcolor=#fefefe
| 289171 ||  || — || November 5, 2004 || Palomar || NEAT || NYS || align=right data-sort-value="0.66" | 660 m || 
|-id=172 bgcolor=#d6d6d6
| 289172 ||  || — || November 10, 2004 || Kitt Peak || Spacewatch || — || align=right | 3.2 km || 
|-id=173 bgcolor=#fefefe
| 289173 ||  || — || November 10, 2004 || Kitt Peak || Spacewatch || — || align=right data-sort-value="0.90" | 900 m || 
|-id=174 bgcolor=#d6d6d6
| 289174 ||  || — || November 10, 2004 || Kitt Peak || Spacewatch || — || align=right | 4.1 km || 
|-id=175 bgcolor=#E9E9E9
| 289175 ||  || — || November 5, 2004 || Kitt Peak || Spacewatch || KON || align=right | 2.0 km || 
|-id=176 bgcolor=#fefefe
| 289176 ||  || — || November 5, 2004 || Palomar || NEAT || MAS || align=right data-sort-value="0.84" | 840 m || 
|-id=177 bgcolor=#fefefe
| 289177 ||  || — || November 4, 2004 || Catalina || CSS || — || align=right | 1.1 km || 
|-id=178 bgcolor=#fefefe
| 289178 ||  || — || November 4, 2004 || Catalina || CSS || — || align=right data-sort-value="0.86" | 860 m || 
|-id=179 bgcolor=#d6d6d6
| 289179 ||  || — || November 11, 2004 || Anderson Mesa || LONEOS || — || align=right | 4.4 km || 
|-id=180 bgcolor=#d6d6d6
| 289180 ||  || — || November 12, 2004 || Catalina || CSS || — || align=right | 5.0 km || 
|-id=181 bgcolor=#E9E9E9
| 289181 ||  || — || November 12, 2004 || Catalina || CSS || — || align=right | 3.0 km || 
|-id=182 bgcolor=#d6d6d6
| 289182 ||  || — || November 12, 2004 || Catalina || CSS || EOS || align=right | 2.9 km || 
|-id=183 bgcolor=#fefefe
| 289183 ||  || — || November 13, 2004 || Catalina || CSS || PHO || align=right | 2.0 km || 
|-id=184 bgcolor=#E9E9E9
| 289184 ||  || — || November 12, 2004 || Catalina || CSS || — || align=right | 1.2 km || 
|-id=185 bgcolor=#fefefe
| 289185 ||  || — || November 13, 2004 || Catalina || CSS || V || align=right data-sort-value="0.91" | 910 m || 
|-id=186 bgcolor=#d6d6d6
| 289186 ||  || — || November 12, 2004 || Siding Spring || SSS || EUP || align=right | 5.3 km || 
|-id=187 bgcolor=#d6d6d6
| 289187 ||  || — || November 10, 2004 || Kitt Peak || Spacewatch || — || align=right | 2.9 km || 
|-id=188 bgcolor=#d6d6d6
| 289188 ||  || — || November 10, 2004 || Kitt Peak || Spacewatch || SHU3:2 || align=right | 7.4 km || 
|-id=189 bgcolor=#fefefe
| 289189 ||  || — || November 10, 2004 || Kitt Peak || Spacewatch || FLO || align=right data-sort-value="0.80" | 800 m || 
|-id=190 bgcolor=#fefefe
| 289190 ||  || — || November 3, 2004 || Anderson Mesa || LONEOS || — || align=right | 1.0 km || 
|-id=191 bgcolor=#fefefe
| 289191 ||  || — || November 17, 2004 || Campo Imperatore || CINEOS || MAS || align=right data-sort-value="0.75" | 750 m || 
|-id=192 bgcolor=#fefefe
| 289192 ||  || — || November 19, 2004 || Kitt Peak || Spacewatch || NYS || align=right data-sort-value="0.62" | 620 m || 
|-id=193 bgcolor=#fefefe
| 289193 ||  || — || November 19, 2004 || Socorro || LINEAR || ERI || align=right | 3.1 km || 
|-id=194 bgcolor=#E9E9E9
| 289194 ||  || — || November 20, 2004 || Kitt Peak || Spacewatch || — || align=right | 1.2 km || 
|-id=195 bgcolor=#fefefe
| 289195 ||  || — || November 30, 2004 || Anderson Mesa || LONEOS || NYS || align=right data-sort-value="0.92" | 920 m || 
|-id=196 bgcolor=#fefefe
| 289196 ||  || — || November 19, 2004 || Socorro || LINEAR || V || align=right data-sort-value="0.99" | 990 m || 
|-id=197 bgcolor=#d6d6d6
| 289197 ||  || — || December 1, 2004 || Palomar || NEAT || — || align=right | 3.4 km || 
|-id=198 bgcolor=#fefefe
| 289198 ||  || — || December 2, 2004 || Catalina || CSS || — || align=right | 1.4 km || 
|-id=199 bgcolor=#E9E9E9
| 289199 ||  || — || December 2, 2004 || Catalina || CSS || MRX || align=right | 1.2 km || 
|-id=200 bgcolor=#fefefe
| 289200 ||  || — || December 2, 2004 || Socorro || LINEAR || FLO || align=right | 1.0 km || 
|}

289201–289300 

|-bgcolor=#fefefe
| 289201 ||  || — || December 5, 2004 || Jonathan B. Postel || Jonathan B. Postel Obs. || NYS || align=right data-sort-value="0.70" | 700 m || 
|-id=202 bgcolor=#fefefe
| 289202 ||  || — || December 9, 2004 || Jarnac || Jarnac Obs. || NYS || align=right | 1.0 km || 
|-id=203 bgcolor=#E9E9E9
| 289203 ||  || — || December 2, 2004 || Palomar || NEAT || — || align=right | 1.7 km || 
|-id=204 bgcolor=#fefefe
| 289204 ||  || — || December 2, 2004 || Catalina || CSS || — || align=right | 1.1 km || 
|-id=205 bgcolor=#fefefe
| 289205 ||  || — || December 7, 2004 || Socorro || LINEAR || V || align=right | 1.1 km || 
|-id=206 bgcolor=#fefefe
| 289206 ||  || — || December 8, 2004 || Socorro || LINEAR || — || align=right | 1.1 km || 
|-id=207 bgcolor=#fefefe
| 289207 ||  || — || December 8, 2004 || Socorro || LINEAR || NYS || align=right data-sort-value="0.77" | 770 m || 
|-id=208 bgcolor=#fefefe
| 289208 ||  || — || December 3, 2004 || Palomar || NEAT || — || align=right | 1.3 km || 
|-id=209 bgcolor=#E9E9E9
| 289209 ||  || — || December 8, 2004 || Socorro || LINEAR || — || align=right | 2.5 km || 
|-id=210 bgcolor=#fefefe
| 289210 ||  || — || December 8, 2004 || Socorro || LINEAR || — || align=right | 1.2 km || 
|-id=211 bgcolor=#E9E9E9
| 289211 ||  || — || December 8, 2004 || Socorro || LINEAR || POS || align=right | 4.3 km || 
|-id=212 bgcolor=#E9E9E9
| 289212 ||  || — || December 8, 2004 || Socorro || LINEAR || — || align=right | 2.5 km || 
|-id=213 bgcolor=#E9E9E9
| 289213 ||  || — || December 9, 2004 || Kitt Peak || Spacewatch || — || align=right | 2.3 km || 
|-id=214 bgcolor=#E9E9E9
| 289214 ||  || — || December 9, 2004 || Catalina || CSS || — || align=right | 2.5 km || 
|-id=215 bgcolor=#E9E9E9
| 289215 ||  || — || December 10, 2004 || Socorro || LINEAR || — || align=right | 2.3 km || 
|-id=216 bgcolor=#fefefe
| 289216 ||  || — || December 9, 2004 || Catalina || CSS || — || align=right | 1.1 km || 
|-id=217 bgcolor=#d6d6d6
| 289217 ||  || — || December 10, 2004 || Socorro || LINEAR || — || align=right | 5.1 km || 
|-id=218 bgcolor=#E9E9E9
| 289218 ||  || — || December 7, 2004 || Socorro || LINEAR || — || align=right | 2.9 km || 
|-id=219 bgcolor=#d6d6d6
| 289219 ||  || — || December 11, 2004 || Socorro || LINEAR || ALA || align=right | 7.0 km || 
|-id=220 bgcolor=#E9E9E9
| 289220 ||  || — || December 11, 2004 || Socorro || LINEAR || — || align=right | 1.5 km || 
|-id=221 bgcolor=#fefefe
| 289221 ||  || — || December 11, 2004 || Campo Imperatore || CINEOS || — || align=right data-sort-value="0.92" | 920 m || 
|-id=222 bgcolor=#E9E9E9
| 289222 ||  || — || December 11, 2004 || Campo Imperatore || CINEOS || — || align=right | 2.6 km || 
|-id=223 bgcolor=#E9E9E9
| 289223 ||  || — || December 9, 2004 || Kitt Peak || Spacewatch || — || align=right | 1.4 km || 
|-id=224 bgcolor=#E9E9E9
| 289224 ||  || — || December 10, 2004 || Socorro || LINEAR || — || align=right | 1.8 km || 
|-id=225 bgcolor=#E9E9E9
| 289225 ||  || — || December 10, 2004 || Kitt Peak || Spacewatch || — || align=right | 1.6 km || 
|-id=226 bgcolor=#E9E9E9
| 289226 ||  || — || December 12, 2004 || Kitt Peak || Spacewatch || NEM || align=right | 3.0 km || 
|-id=227 bgcolor=#FFC2E0
| 289227 ||  || — || December 14, 2004 || Siding Spring || SSS || ATE || align=right data-sort-value="0.58" | 580 m || 
|-id=228 bgcolor=#d6d6d6
| 289228 ||  || — || December 12, 2004 || Needville || Needville Obs. || EUP || align=right | 4.5 km || 
|-id=229 bgcolor=#d6d6d6
| 289229 ||  || — || December 8, 2004 || Socorro || LINEAR || — || align=right | 3.0 km || 
|-id=230 bgcolor=#E9E9E9
| 289230 ||  || — || December 2, 2004 || Kitt Peak || Spacewatch || — || align=right | 2.3 km || 
|-id=231 bgcolor=#d6d6d6
| 289231 ||  || — || December 2, 2004 || Palomar || NEAT || SHU3:2 || align=right | 7.3 km || 
|-id=232 bgcolor=#fefefe
| 289232 ||  || — || December 10, 2004 || Socorro || LINEAR || — || align=right | 1.1 km || 
|-id=233 bgcolor=#fefefe
| 289233 ||  || — || December 10, 2004 || Catalina || CSS || — || align=right | 1.3 km || 
|-id=234 bgcolor=#E9E9E9
| 289234 ||  || — || December 11, 2004 || Catalina || CSS || — || align=right | 3.0 km || 
|-id=235 bgcolor=#fefefe
| 289235 ||  || — || December 11, 2004 || Kitt Peak || Spacewatch || — || align=right data-sort-value="0.82" | 820 m || 
|-id=236 bgcolor=#fefefe
| 289236 ||  || — || December 9, 2004 || Kitt Peak || Spacewatch || V || align=right | 1.1 km || 
|-id=237 bgcolor=#d6d6d6
| 289237 ||  || — || December 9, 2004 || Kitt Peak || Spacewatch || — || align=right | 3.8 km || 
|-id=238 bgcolor=#d6d6d6
| 289238 ||  || — || December 9, 2004 || Catalina || CSS || — || align=right | 5.2 km || 
|-id=239 bgcolor=#fefefe
| 289239 ||  || — || December 10, 2004 || Kitt Peak || Spacewatch || NYS || align=right | 1.1 km || 
|-id=240 bgcolor=#d6d6d6
| 289240 ||  || — || December 10, 2004 || Socorro || LINEAR || — || align=right | 4.3 km || 
|-id=241 bgcolor=#d6d6d6
| 289241 ||  || — || December 10, 2004 || Vail-Jarnac || Jarnac Obs. || — || align=right | 4.2 km || 
|-id=242 bgcolor=#d6d6d6
| 289242 ||  || — || December 10, 2004 || Socorro || LINEAR || ELF || align=right | 5.6 km || 
|-id=243 bgcolor=#d6d6d6
| 289243 ||  || — || December 10, 2004 || Socorro || LINEAR || — || align=right | 3.3 km || 
|-id=244 bgcolor=#fefefe
| 289244 ||  || — || December 10, 2004 || Socorro || LINEAR || — || align=right data-sort-value="0.92" | 920 m || 
|-id=245 bgcolor=#d6d6d6
| 289245 ||  || — || December 10, 2004 || Socorro || LINEAR || THM || align=right | 2.9 km || 
|-id=246 bgcolor=#fefefe
| 289246 ||  || — || December 10, 2004 || Socorro || LINEAR || — || align=right | 1.1 km || 
|-id=247 bgcolor=#fefefe
| 289247 ||  || — || December 11, 2004 || Kitt Peak || Spacewatch || NYS || align=right data-sort-value="0.81" | 810 m || 
|-id=248 bgcolor=#d6d6d6
| 289248 ||  || — || December 12, 2004 || Kitt Peak || Spacewatch || THM || align=right | 3.4 km || 
|-id=249 bgcolor=#fefefe
| 289249 ||  || — || December 12, 2004 || Kitt Peak || Spacewatch || NYS || align=right data-sort-value="0.86" | 860 m || 
|-id=250 bgcolor=#E9E9E9
| 289250 ||  || — || December 13, 2004 || Kitt Peak || Spacewatch || — || align=right | 4.3 km || 
|-id=251 bgcolor=#fefefe
| 289251 ||  || — || December 13, 2004 || Kitt Peak || Spacewatch || — || align=right | 1.3 km || 
|-id=252 bgcolor=#E9E9E9
| 289252 ||  || — || December 13, 2004 || Kitt Peak || Spacewatch || — || align=right | 1.6 km || 
|-id=253 bgcolor=#fefefe
| 289253 ||  || — || December 13, 2004 || Kitt Peak || Spacewatch || ERI || align=right | 1.9 km || 
|-id=254 bgcolor=#fefefe
| 289254 ||  || — || December 10, 2004 || Campo Imperatore || CINEOS || — || align=right | 1.2 km || 
|-id=255 bgcolor=#fefefe
| 289255 ||  || — || December 11, 2004 || Socorro || LINEAR || — || align=right | 1.1 km || 
|-id=256 bgcolor=#fefefe
| 289256 ||  || — || December 11, 2004 || Socorro || LINEAR || — || align=right data-sort-value="0.96" | 960 m || 
|-id=257 bgcolor=#fefefe
| 289257 ||  || — || December 12, 2004 || Kitt Peak || Spacewatch || MAS || align=right data-sort-value="0.93" | 930 m || 
|-id=258 bgcolor=#fefefe
| 289258 ||  || — || December 14, 2004 || Socorro || LINEAR || NYS || align=right data-sort-value="0.86" | 860 m || 
|-id=259 bgcolor=#fefefe
| 289259 ||  || — || December 14, 2004 || Catalina || CSS || — || align=right | 1.1 km || 
|-id=260 bgcolor=#fefefe
| 289260 ||  || — || December 10, 2004 || Palomar || NEAT || NYS || align=right | 1.1 km || 
|-id=261 bgcolor=#d6d6d6
| 289261 ||  || — || December 11, 2004 || Catalina || CSS || 3:2 || align=right | 5.3 km || 
|-id=262 bgcolor=#fefefe
| 289262 ||  || — || December 14, 2004 || Kitt Peak || Spacewatch || — || align=right data-sort-value="0.96" | 960 m || 
|-id=263 bgcolor=#fefefe
| 289263 ||  || — || December 12, 2004 || Kitt Peak || Spacewatch || NYS || align=right data-sort-value="0.82" | 820 m || 
|-id=264 bgcolor=#fefefe
| 289264 ||  || — || December 14, 2004 || Socorro || LINEAR || — || align=right | 1.0 km || 
|-id=265 bgcolor=#fefefe
| 289265 ||  || — || December 10, 2004 || Socorro || LINEAR || MAS || align=right data-sort-value="0.87" | 870 m || 
|-id=266 bgcolor=#fefefe
| 289266 ||  || — || December 10, 2004 || Socorro || LINEAR || — || align=right | 1.6 km || 
|-id=267 bgcolor=#d6d6d6
| 289267 ||  || — || December 11, 2004 || Kitt Peak || Spacewatch || — || align=right | 3.3 km || 
|-id=268 bgcolor=#fefefe
| 289268 ||  || — || December 14, 2004 || Socorro || LINEAR || NYS || align=right data-sort-value="0.87" | 870 m || 
|-id=269 bgcolor=#E9E9E9
| 289269 ||  || — || December 2, 2004 || Palomar || NEAT || NEM || align=right | 2.8 km || 
|-id=270 bgcolor=#d6d6d6
| 289270 ||  || — || December 9, 2004 || Kitt Peak || Spacewatch || — || align=right | 4.1 km || 
|-id=271 bgcolor=#E9E9E9
| 289271 ||  || — || December 12, 2004 || Campo Imperatore || CINEOS || — || align=right | 3.0 km || 
|-id=272 bgcolor=#fefefe
| 289272 ||  || — || December 14, 2004 || Bergisch Gladbach || W. Bickel || — || align=right data-sort-value="0.96" | 960 m || 
|-id=273 bgcolor=#fefefe
| 289273 ||  || — || December 14, 2004 || Anderson Mesa || LONEOS || FLO || align=right data-sort-value="0.92" | 920 m || 
|-id=274 bgcolor=#fefefe
| 289274 ||  || — || December 15, 2004 || Campo Imperatore || CINEOS || FLO || align=right data-sort-value="0.87" | 870 m || 
|-id=275 bgcolor=#d6d6d6
| 289275 ||  || — || December 14, 2004 || Campo Imperatore || CINEOS || HYG || align=right | 3.8 km || 
|-id=276 bgcolor=#fefefe
| 289276 ||  || — || December 15, 2004 || Kitt Peak || Spacewatch || MAS || align=right data-sort-value="0.72" | 720 m || 
|-id=277 bgcolor=#d6d6d6
| 289277 ||  || — || December 15, 2004 || Kitt Peak || Spacewatch || VER || align=right | 4.2 km || 
|-id=278 bgcolor=#fefefe
| 289278 ||  || — || December 14, 2004 || Kitt Peak || Spacewatch || — || align=right | 1.0 km || 
|-id=279 bgcolor=#fefefe
| 289279 ||  || — || December 15, 2004 || Socorro || LINEAR || — || align=right | 1.4 km || 
|-id=280 bgcolor=#E9E9E9
| 289280 ||  || — || December 15, 2004 || Socorro || LINEAR || — || align=right | 1.5 km || 
|-id=281 bgcolor=#d6d6d6
| 289281 ||  || — || December 15, 2004 || Catalina || CSS || — || align=right | 3.9 km || 
|-id=282 bgcolor=#FA8072
| 289282 ||  || — || December 2, 2004 || Palomar || NEAT || — || align=right | 1.2 km || 
|-id=283 bgcolor=#fefefe
| 289283 ||  || — || December 10, 2004 || Kitt Peak || Spacewatch || — || align=right | 1.2 km || 
|-id=284 bgcolor=#fefefe
| 289284 ||  || — || December 14, 2004 || Anderson Mesa || LONEOS || — || align=right | 1.2 km || 
|-id=285 bgcolor=#C2FFFF
| 289285 ||  || — || December 15, 2004 || Kitt Peak || Spacewatch || L5 || align=right | 15 km || 
|-id=286 bgcolor=#fefefe
| 289286 ||  || — || December 14, 2004 || Kitt Peak || Spacewatch || — || align=right data-sort-value="0.75" | 750 m || 
|-id=287 bgcolor=#E9E9E9
| 289287 ||  || — || December 16, 2004 || Socorro || LINEAR || MRX || align=right | 1.4 km || 
|-id=288 bgcolor=#fefefe
| 289288 ||  || — || December 18, 2004 || Mount Lemmon || Mount Lemmon Survey || — || align=right | 1.1 km || 
|-id=289 bgcolor=#d6d6d6
| 289289 ||  || — || December 18, 2004 || Mount Lemmon || Mount Lemmon Survey || NAE || align=right | 4.5 km || 
|-id=290 bgcolor=#fefefe
| 289290 ||  || — || December 18, 2004 || Mount Lemmon || Mount Lemmon Survey || MAS || align=right | 1.1 km || 
|-id=291 bgcolor=#fefefe
| 289291 ||  || — || December 18, 2004 || Mount Lemmon || Mount Lemmon Survey || — || align=right data-sort-value="0.82" | 820 m || 
|-id=292 bgcolor=#E9E9E9
| 289292 ||  || — || December 18, 2004 || Mount Lemmon || Mount Lemmon Survey || — || align=right | 1.3 km || 
|-id=293 bgcolor=#fefefe
| 289293 ||  || — || December 18, 2004 || Mount Lemmon || Mount Lemmon Survey || — || align=right data-sort-value="0.98" | 980 m || 
|-id=294 bgcolor=#d6d6d6
| 289294 ||  || — || December 18, 2004 || Mount Lemmon || Mount Lemmon Survey || — || align=right | 3.5 km || 
|-id=295 bgcolor=#fefefe
| 289295 ||  || — || December 18, 2004 || Mount Lemmon || Mount Lemmon Survey || NYS || align=right data-sort-value="0.91" | 910 m || 
|-id=296 bgcolor=#d6d6d6
| 289296 ||  || — || December 16, 2004 || Kitt Peak || Spacewatch || — || align=right | 4.1 km || 
|-id=297 bgcolor=#E9E9E9
| 289297 ||  || — || December 18, 2004 || Mount Lemmon || Mount Lemmon Survey || — || align=right | 1.9 km || 
|-id=298 bgcolor=#fefefe
| 289298 ||  || — || December 16, 2004 || Anderson Mesa || LONEOS || — || align=right | 1.6 km || 
|-id=299 bgcolor=#fefefe
| 289299 ||  || — || January 1, 2005 || Catalina || CSS || — || align=right | 1.2 km || 
|-id=300 bgcolor=#fefefe
| 289300 ||  || — || January 6, 2005 || Catalina || CSS || — || align=right data-sort-value="0.90" | 900 m || 
|}

289301–289400 

|-bgcolor=#fefefe
| 289301 ||  || — || January 6, 2005 || Socorro || LINEAR || — || align=right data-sort-value="0.94" | 940 m || 
|-id=302 bgcolor=#fefefe
| 289302 ||  || — || January 1, 2005 || Catalina || CSS || — || align=right | 1.5 km || 
|-id=303 bgcolor=#E9E9E9
| 289303 ||  || — || January 6, 2005 || Catalina || CSS || — || align=right | 2.1 km || 
|-id=304 bgcolor=#fefefe
| 289304 ||  || — || January 6, 2005 || Socorro || LINEAR || — || align=right | 4.3 km || 
|-id=305 bgcolor=#E9E9E9
| 289305 ||  || — || January 6, 2005 || Catalina || CSS || GEF || align=right | 1.6 km || 
|-id=306 bgcolor=#E9E9E9
| 289306 ||  || — || January 1, 2005 || Catalina || CSS || — || align=right | 2.1 km || 
|-id=307 bgcolor=#E9E9E9
| 289307 ||  || — || January 6, 2005 || Socorro || LINEAR || MIS || align=right | 2.9 km || 
|-id=308 bgcolor=#fefefe
| 289308 ||  || — || January 7, 2005 || Socorro || LINEAR || — || align=right | 1.3 km || 
|-id=309 bgcolor=#E9E9E9
| 289309 ||  || — || January 6, 2005 || Socorro || LINEAR || — || align=right | 2.1 km || 
|-id=310 bgcolor=#fefefe
| 289310 ||  || — || January 6, 2005 || Socorro || LINEAR || CHL || align=right | 2.6 km || 
|-id=311 bgcolor=#E9E9E9
| 289311 ||  || — || January 6, 2005 || Socorro || LINEAR || EUN || align=right | 1.8 km || 
|-id=312 bgcolor=#E9E9E9
| 289312 ||  || — || January 6, 2005 || Socorro || LINEAR || RAF || align=right | 1.4 km || 
|-id=313 bgcolor=#E9E9E9
| 289313 ||  || — || January 6, 2005 || Socorro || LINEAR || — || align=right | 1.8 km || 
|-id=314 bgcolor=#d6d6d6
| 289314 Chisholm ||  ||  || September 30, 2003 || Mauna Kea || D. D. Balam || — || align=right | 4.6 km || 
|-id=315 bgcolor=#FFC2E0
| 289315 ||  || — || January 13, 2005 || Catalina || CSS || APOPHA || align=right data-sort-value="0.71" | 710 m || 
|-id=316 bgcolor=#E9E9E9
| 289316 ||  || — || January 13, 2005 || Catalina || CSS || — || align=right | 2.6 km || 
|-id=317 bgcolor=#fefefe
| 289317 ||  || — || January 13, 2005 || Vicques || M. Ory || V || align=right data-sort-value="0.88" | 880 m || 
|-id=318 bgcolor=#d6d6d6
| 289318 ||  || — || January 13, 2005 || Vicques || M. Ory || EOS || align=right | 2.5 km || 
|-id=319 bgcolor=#d6d6d6
| 289319 ||  || — || January 15, 2005 || Catalina || CSS || — || align=right | 4.2 km || 
|-id=320 bgcolor=#fefefe
| 289320 ||  || — || January 15, 2005 || Catalina || CSS || — || align=right | 1.4 km || 
|-id=321 bgcolor=#fefefe
| 289321 ||  || — || January 13, 2005 || Catalina || CSS || — || align=right | 1.2 km || 
|-id=322 bgcolor=#fefefe
| 289322 ||  || — || January 15, 2005 || Catalina || CSS || H || align=right data-sort-value="0.92" | 920 m || 
|-id=323 bgcolor=#E9E9E9
| 289323 ||  || — || January 11, 2005 || Socorro || LINEAR || — || align=right | 1.5 km || 
|-id=324 bgcolor=#E9E9E9
| 289324 ||  || — || January 13, 2005 || Kitt Peak || Spacewatch || MAR || align=right | 1.3 km || 
|-id=325 bgcolor=#fefefe
| 289325 ||  || — || January 13, 2005 || Socorro || LINEAR || — || align=right | 1.2 km || 
|-id=326 bgcolor=#fefefe
| 289326 ||  || — || January 13, 2005 || Catalina || CSS || — || align=right | 1.4 km || 
|-id=327 bgcolor=#C2FFFF
| 289327 ||  || — || January 13, 2005 || Kitt Peak || Spacewatch || L5 || align=right | 11 km || 
|-id=328 bgcolor=#E9E9E9
| 289328 ||  || — || January 13, 2005 || Socorro || LINEAR || RAF || align=right | 1.4 km || 
|-id=329 bgcolor=#E9E9E9
| 289329 ||  || — || January 15, 2005 || Anderson Mesa || LONEOS || EUN || align=right | 1.8 km || 
|-id=330 bgcolor=#fefefe
| 289330 ||  || — || January 15, 2005 || Socorro || LINEAR || — || align=right | 1.3 km || 
|-id=331 bgcolor=#fefefe
| 289331 ||  || — || January 13, 2005 || Kitt Peak || Spacewatch || FLO || align=right data-sort-value="0.73" | 730 m || 
|-id=332 bgcolor=#E9E9E9
| 289332 ||  || — || January 13, 2005 || Kitt Peak || Spacewatch || WIT || align=right | 1.4 km || 
|-id=333 bgcolor=#E9E9E9
| 289333 ||  || — || January 13, 2005 || Catalina || CSS || — || align=right | 1.6 km || 
|-id=334 bgcolor=#fefefe
| 289334 ||  || — || January 15, 2005 || Kitt Peak || Spacewatch || — || align=right data-sort-value="0.90" | 900 m || 
|-id=335 bgcolor=#d6d6d6
| 289335 ||  || — || January 15, 2005 || Kitt Peak || Spacewatch || — || align=right | 2.8 km || 
|-id=336 bgcolor=#fefefe
| 289336 ||  || — || January 15, 2005 || Kitt Peak || Spacewatch || MAS || align=right data-sort-value="0.82" | 820 m || 
|-id=337 bgcolor=#E9E9E9
| 289337 ||  || — || January 15, 2005 || Catalina || CSS || JUN || align=right data-sort-value="0.92" | 920 m || 
|-id=338 bgcolor=#d6d6d6
| 289338 ||  || — || January 13, 2005 || Kitt Peak || Spacewatch || LIX || align=right | 3.9 km || 
|-id=339 bgcolor=#E9E9E9
| 289339 ||  || — || January 15, 2005 || Kitt Peak || Spacewatch || — || align=right | 2.7 km || 
|-id=340 bgcolor=#E9E9E9
| 289340 ||  || — || January 13, 2005 || Kitt Peak || Spacewatch || — || align=right | 1.1 km || 
|-id=341 bgcolor=#E9E9E9
| 289341 ||  || — || January 16, 2005 || Anderson Mesa || LONEOS || — || align=right | 2.0 km || 
|-id=342 bgcolor=#fefefe
| 289342 ||  || — || January 16, 2005 || Socorro || LINEAR || — || align=right | 1.2 km || 
|-id=343 bgcolor=#fefefe
| 289343 ||  || — || January 16, 2005 || Socorro || LINEAR || NYS || align=right data-sort-value="0.91" | 910 m || 
|-id=344 bgcolor=#fefefe
| 289344 ||  || — || January 16, 2005 || Socorro || LINEAR || — || align=right | 1.2 km || 
|-id=345 bgcolor=#fefefe
| 289345 ||  || — || January 16, 2005 || Socorro || LINEAR || NYS || align=right data-sort-value="0.97" | 970 m || 
|-id=346 bgcolor=#d6d6d6
| 289346 ||  || — || January 16, 2005 || Socorro || LINEAR || — || align=right | 4.7 km || 
|-id=347 bgcolor=#E9E9E9
| 289347 ||  || — || January 16, 2005 || Socorro || LINEAR || — || align=right | 1.4 km || 
|-id=348 bgcolor=#fefefe
| 289348 ||  || — || January 17, 2005 || Kitt Peak || Spacewatch || — || align=right | 1.2 km || 
|-id=349 bgcolor=#E9E9E9
| 289349 ||  || — || January 16, 2005 || Kitt Peak || Spacewatch || KON || align=right | 3.2 km || 
|-id=350 bgcolor=#E9E9E9
| 289350 ||  || — || January 16, 2005 || Socorro || LINEAR || — || align=right | 2.2 km || 
|-id=351 bgcolor=#fefefe
| 289351 ||  || — || January 16, 2005 || Kitt Peak || Spacewatch || NYS || align=right data-sort-value="0.73" | 730 m || 
|-id=352 bgcolor=#fefefe
| 289352 ||  || — || January 16, 2005 || Kitt Peak || Spacewatch || NYS || align=right data-sort-value="0.78" | 780 m || 
|-id=353 bgcolor=#E9E9E9
| 289353 ||  || — || January 16, 2005 || Socorro || LINEAR || — || align=right | 2.0 km || 
|-id=354 bgcolor=#E9E9E9
| 289354 ||  || — || January 16, 2005 || Socorro || LINEAR || — || align=right | 4.6 km || 
|-id=355 bgcolor=#E9E9E9
| 289355 ||  || — || January 18, 2005 || Kitt Peak || Spacewatch || AEO || align=right | 1.3 km || 
|-id=356 bgcolor=#E9E9E9
| 289356 ||  || — || January 18, 2005 || Catalina || CSS || — || align=right | 2.3 km || 
|-id=357 bgcolor=#fefefe
| 289357 ||  || — || January 31, 2005 || Socorro || LINEAR || H || align=right data-sort-value="0.76" | 760 m || 
|-id=358 bgcolor=#E9E9E9
| 289358 ||  || — || January 31, 2005 || Palomar || NEAT || — || align=right | 2.6 km || 
|-id=359 bgcolor=#E9E9E9
| 289359 ||  || — || January 31, 2005 || Anderson Mesa || LONEOS || — || align=right | 2.0 km || 
|-id=360 bgcolor=#fefefe
| 289360 ||  || — || January 16, 2005 || Mauna Kea || C. Veillet || FLO || align=right data-sort-value="0.71" | 710 m || 
|-id=361 bgcolor=#fefefe
| 289361 ||  || — || January 16, 2005 || Mauna Kea || C. Veillet || — || align=right data-sort-value="0.58" | 580 m || 
|-id=362 bgcolor=#d6d6d6
| 289362 ||  || — || January 19, 2005 || Kitt Peak || Spacewatch || 7:4 || align=right | 5.8 km || 
|-id=363 bgcolor=#E9E9E9
| 289363 ||  || — || January 18, 2005 || Mayhill || A. Lowe || — || align=right | 1.8 km || 
|-id=364 bgcolor=#E9E9E9
| 289364 ||  || — || January 18, 2005 || Catalina || CSS || — || align=right | 1.4 km || 
|-id=365 bgcolor=#E9E9E9
| 289365 ||  || — || February 1, 2005 || Kitt Peak || Spacewatch || — || align=right | 1.6 km || 
|-id=366 bgcolor=#fefefe
| 289366 ||  || — || February 1, 2005 || Kitt Peak || Spacewatch || — || align=right data-sort-value="0.89" | 890 m || 
|-id=367 bgcolor=#E9E9E9
| 289367 ||  || — || February 1, 2005 || Kitt Peak || Spacewatch || — || align=right | 1.5 km || 
|-id=368 bgcolor=#fefefe
| 289368 ||  || — || February 1, 2005 || Catalina || CSS || FLO || align=right data-sort-value="0.84" | 840 m || 
|-id=369 bgcolor=#fefefe
| 289369 ||  || — || February 1, 2005 || Palomar || NEAT || — || align=right data-sort-value="0.86" | 860 m || 
|-id=370 bgcolor=#E9E9E9
| 289370 ||  || — || February 1, 2005 || Kitt Peak || Spacewatch || — || align=right | 1.9 km || 
|-id=371 bgcolor=#d6d6d6
| 289371 ||  || — || February 1, 2005 || Kitt Peak || Spacewatch || — || align=right | 4.7 km || 
|-id=372 bgcolor=#E9E9E9
| 289372 ||  || — || February 1, 2005 || Kitt Peak || Spacewatch || — || align=right | 1.2 km || 
|-id=373 bgcolor=#fefefe
| 289373 ||  || — || February 2, 2005 || Kitt Peak || Spacewatch || — || align=right data-sort-value="0.96" | 960 m || 
|-id=374 bgcolor=#fefefe
| 289374 ||  || — || February 2, 2005 || Kitt Peak || Spacewatch || — || align=right | 1.0 km || 
|-id=375 bgcolor=#d6d6d6
| 289375 ||  || — || February 2, 2005 || Kitt Peak || Spacewatch || EUP || align=right | 4.4 km || 
|-id=376 bgcolor=#fefefe
| 289376 ||  || — || February 2, 2005 || Kitt Peak || Spacewatch || NYS || align=right | 1.0 km || 
|-id=377 bgcolor=#fefefe
| 289377 ||  || — || February 2, 2005 || Socorro || LINEAR || — || align=right | 1.1 km || 
|-id=378 bgcolor=#fefefe
| 289378 ||  || — || February 2, 2005 || Socorro || LINEAR || — || align=right data-sort-value="0.68" | 680 m || 
|-id=379 bgcolor=#fefefe
| 289379 ||  || — || February 2, 2005 || Catalina || CSS || — || align=right data-sort-value="0.97" | 970 m || 
|-id=380 bgcolor=#E9E9E9
| 289380 ||  || — || February 2, 2005 || Palomar || NEAT || — || align=right | 1.6 km || 
|-id=381 bgcolor=#fefefe
| 289381 ||  || — || February 4, 2005 || Palomar || NEAT || V || align=right data-sort-value="0.83" | 830 m || 
|-id=382 bgcolor=#E9E9E9
| 289382 ||  || — || February 4, 2005 || Catalina || CSS || KON || align=right | 4.3 km || 
|-id=383 bgcolor=#fefefe
| 289383 ||  || — || February 1, 2005 || Catalina || CSS || — || align=right data-sort-value="0.73" | 730 m || 
|-id=384 bgcolor=#E9E9E9
| 289384 ||  || — || February 1, 2005 || Kitt Peak || Spacewatch || — || align=right | 2.7 km || 
|-id=385 bgcolor=#fefefe
| 289385 ||  || — || February 1, 2005 || Kitt Peak || Spacewatch || NYS || align=right data-sort-value="0.72" | 720 m || 
|-id=386 bgcolor=#E9E9E9
| 289386 ||  || — || February 1, 2005 || Kitt Peak || Spacewatch || AGN || align=right | 1.6 km || 
|-id=387 bgcolor=#fefefe
| 289387 ||  || — || February 1, 2005 || Kitt Peak || Spacewatch || NYS || align=right data-sort-value="0.81" | 810 m || 
|-id=388 bgcolor=#E9E9E9
| 289388 ||  || — || February 2, 2005 || Kitt Peak || Spacewatch || — || align=right | 2.5 km || 
|-id=389 bgcolor=#fefefe
| 289389 ||  || — || February 2, 2005 || Kitt Peak || Spacewatch || — || align=right data-sort-value="0.81" | 810 m || 
|-id=390 bgcolor=#E9E9E9
| 289390 ||  || — || February 2, 2005 || Kitt Peak || Spacewatch || — || align=right | 2.4 km || 
|-id=391 bgcolor=#fefefe
| 289391 ||  || — || February 3, 2005 || Socorro || LINEAR || FLO || align=right data-sort-value="0.77" | 770 m || 
|-id=392 bgcolor=#E9E9E9
| 289392 ||  || — || February 3, 2005 || Socorro || LINEAR || — || align=right data-sort-value="0.92" | 920 m || 
|-id=393 bgcolor=#fefefe
| 289393 ||  || — || February 1, 2005 || Kitt Peak || Spacewatch || NYS || align=right data-sort-value="0.66" | 660 m || 
|-id=394 bgcolor=#FA8072
| 289394 ||  || — || February 2, 2005 || Kitt Peak || Spacewatch || H || align=right data-sort-value="0.72" | 720 m || 
|-id=395 bgcolor=#E9E9E9
| 289395 ||  || — || February 8, 2005 || Jonathan B. Postel || Jonathan B. Postel Obs. || MIT || align=right | 3.8 km || 
|-id=396 bgcolor=#fefefe
| 289396 ||  || — || February 9, 2005 || La Silla || A. Boattini, H. Scholl || — || align=right data-sort-value="0.84" | 840 m || 
|-id=397 bgcolor=#fefefe
| 289397 ||  || — || February 2, 2005 || Catalina || CSS || MAS || align=right data-sort-value="0.77" | 770 m || 
|-id=398 bgcolor=#d6d6d6
| 289398 ||  || — || February 2, 2005 || Kitt Peak || Spacewatch || CHA || align=right | 2.5 km || 
|-id=399 bgcolor=#d6d6d6
| 289399 ||  || — || February 2, 2005 || Kitt Peak || Spacewatch || — || align=right | 6.0 km || 
|-id=400 bgcolor=#fefefe
| 289400 ||  || — || February 2, 2005 || Kitt Peak || Spacewatch || NYS || align=right data-sort-value="0.76" | 760 m || 
|}

289401–289500 

|-bgcolor=#fefefe
| 289401 ||  || — || February 2, 2005 || Kitt Peak || Spacewatch || NYS || align=right data-sort-value="0.86" | 860 m || 
|-id=402 bgcolor=#E9E9E9
| 289402 ||  || — || February 2, 2005 || Socorro || LINEAR || — || align=right | 1.4 km || 
|-id=403 bgcolor=#E9E9E9
| 289403 ||  || — || February 2, 2005 || Socorro || LINEAR || — || align=right | 2.1 km || 
|-id=404 bgcolor=#E9E9E9
| 289404 ||  || — || February 2, 2005 || Socorro || LINEAR || — || align=right | 2.1 km || 
|-id=405 bgcolor=#fefefe
| 289405 ||  || — || February 3, 2005 || Socorro || LINEAR || — || align=right | 1.1 km || 
|-id=406 bgcolor=#fefefe
| 289406 ||  || — || February 2, 2005 || Catalina || CSS || — || align=right data-sort-value="0.89" | 890 m || 
|-id=407 bgcolor=#E9E9E9
| 289407 ||  || — || February 2, 2005 || Catalina || CSS || RAF || align=right | 1.2 km || 
|-id=408 bgcolor=#fefefe
| 289408 ||  || — || February 2, 2005 || Socorro || LINEAR || — || align=right | 1.0 km || 
|-id=409 bgcolor=#d6d6d6
| 289409 ||  || — || February 4, 2005 || Mount Lemmon || Mount Lemmon Survey || — || align=right | 2.7 km || 
|-id=410 bgcolor=#fefefe
| 289410 ||  || — || February 9, 2005 || Socorro || LINEAR || — || align=right data-sort-value="0.84" | 840 m || 
|-id=411 bgcolor=#E9E9E9
| 289411 ||  || — || February 1, 2005 || Kitt Peak || Spacewatch || EUN || align=right | 1.8 km || 
|-id=412 bgcolor=#fefefe
| 289412 ||  || — || February 1, 2005 || Kitt Peak || Spacewatch || — || align=right data-sort-value="0.80" | 800 m || 
|-id=413 bgcolor=#E9E9E9
| 289413 ||  || — || February 2, 2005 || Kitt Peak || Spacewatch || — || align=right | 3.4 km || 
|-id=414 bgcolor=#fefefe
| 289414 ||  || — || February 2, 2005 || Kitt Peak || Spacewatch || NYS || align=right data-sort-value="0.69" | 690 m || 
|-id=415 bgcolor=#d6d6d6
| 289415 ||  || — || February 2, 2005 || Palomar || NEAT || — || align=right | 2.3 km || 
|-id=416 bgcolor=#E9E9E9
| 289416 ||  || — || February 3, 2005 || Palomar || NEAT || — || align=right | 2.2 km || 
|-id=417 bgcolor=#fefefe
| 289417 ||  || — || February 17, 2005 || La Silla || A. Boattini, H. Scholl || — || align=right data-sort-value="0.90" | 900 m || 
|-id=418 bgcolor=#d6d6d6
| 289418 ||  || — || February 17, 2005 || La Silla || A. Boattini, H. Scholl || KAR || align=right | 1.1 km || 
|-id=419 bgcolor=#fefefe
| 289419 ||  || — || March 1, 2005 || Kitt Peak || Spacewatch || — || align=right data-sort-value="0.72" | 720 m || 
|-id=420 bgcolor=#fefefe
| 289420 ||  || — || March 1, 2005 || Kitt Peak || Spacewatch || V || align=right data-sort-value="0.97" | 970 m || 
|-id=421 bgcolor=#fefefe
| 289421 ||  || — || March 1, 2005 || Kitt Peak || Spacewatch || MAS || align=right data-sort-value="0.73" | 730 m || 
|-id=422 bgcolor=#fefefe
| 289422 ||  || — || March 2, 2005 || Kitt Peak || Spacewatch || — || align=right data-sort-value="0.87" | 870 m || 
|-id=423 bgcolor=#E9E9E9
| 289423 ||  || — || March 2, 2005 || Kitt Peak || Spacewatch || MAR || align=right | 1.5 km || 
|-id=424 bgcolor=#E9E9E9
| 289424 ||  || — || March 2, 2005 || Catalina || CSS || XIZ || align=right | 1.9 km || 
|-id=425 bgcolor=#fefefe
| 289425 ||  || — || March 3, 2005 || Kitt Peak || Spacewatch || MAS || align=right data-sort-value="0.92" | 920 m || 
|-id=426 bgcolor=#fefefe
| 289426 ||  || — || March 3, 2005 || Kitt Peak || Spacewatch || — || align=right | 1.1 km || 
|-id=427 bgcolor=#fefefe
| 289427 ||  || — || March 3, 2005 || Kitt Peak || Spacewatch || — || align=right | 1.1 km || 
|-id=428 bgcolor=#fefefe
| 289428 ||  || — || March 3, 2005 || Kitt Peak || Spacewatch || V || align=right data-sort-value="0.61" | 610 m || 
|-id=429 bgcolor=#E9E9E9
| 289429 ||  || — || March 3, 2005 || Kitt Peak || Spacewatch || — || align=right | 1.2 km || 
|-id=430 bgcolor=#fefefe
| 289430 ||  || — || March 3, 2005 || Catalina || CSS || — || align=right | 1.1 km || 
|-id=431 bgcolor=#fefefe
| 289431 ||  || — || March 3, 2005 || Catalina || CSS || — || align=right | 1.1 km || 
|-id=432 bgcolor=#E9E9E9
| 289432 ||  || — || March 3, 2005 || Catalina || CSS || — || align=right | 3.0 km || 
|-id=433 bgcolor=#fefefe
| 289433 ||  || — || March 3, 2005 || Catalina || CSS || V || align=right data-sort-value="0.94" | 940 m || 
|-id=434 bgcolor=#fefefe
| 289434 ||  || — || March 3, 2005 || Catalina || CSS || H || align=right data-sort-value="0.78" | 780 m || 
|-id=435 bgcolor=#E9E9E9
| 289435 ||  || — || March 3, 2005 || Catalina || CSS || — || align=right | 1.1 km || 
|-id=436 bgcolor=#fefefe
| 289436 ||  || — || March 2, 2005 || Calvin-Rehoboth || Calvin–Rehoboth Obs. || — || align=right data-sort-value="0.92" | 920 m || 
|-id=437 bgcolor=#fefefe
| 289437 ||  || — || March 2, 2005 || Kitt Peak || Spacewatch || NYS || align=right data-sort-value="0.78" | 780 m || 
|-id=438 bgcolor=#E9E9E9
| 289438 ||  || — || March 2, 2005 || Socorro || LINEAR || — || align=right | 2.5 km || 
|-id=439 bgcolor=#FA8072
| 289439 ||  || — || March 4, 2005 || Socorro || LINEAR || H || align=right data-sort-value="0.77" | 770 m || 
|-id=440 bgcolor=#fefefe
| 289440 ||  || — || March 3, 2005 || Catalina || CSS || — || align=right | 1.1 km || 
|-id=441 bgcolor=#E9E9E9
| 289441 ||  || — || March 4, 2005 || Catalina || CSS || MIT || align=right | 2.5 km || 
|-id=442 bgcolor=#fefefe
| 289442 ||  || — || March 8, 2005 || Mount Lemmon || Mount Lemmon Survey || NYS || align=right data-sort-value="0.82" | 820 m || 
|-id=443 bgcolor=#fefefe
| 289443 ||  || — || March 1, 2005 || Kitt Peak || Spacewatch || — || align=right data-sort-value="0.87" | 870 m || 
|-id=444 bgcolor=#E9E9E9
| 289444 ||  || — || March 1, 2005 || Catalina || CSS || — || align=right | 3.0 km || 
|-id=445 bgcolor=#E9E9E9
| 289445 ||  || — || March 2, 2005 || Kitt Peak || Spacewatch || — || align=right | 2.1 km || 
|-id=446 bgcolor=#d6d6d6
| 289446 ||  || — || March 3, 2005 || Kitt Peak || Spacewatch || 3:2 || align=right | 12 km || 
|-id=447 bgcolor=#E9E9E9
| 289447 ||  || — || March 3, 2005 || Catalina || CSS || — || align=right | 1.2 km || 
|-id=448 bgcolor=#fefefe
| 289448 ||  || — || March 3, 2005 || Catalina || CSS || FLO || align=right data-sort-value="0.91" | 910 m || 
|-id=449 bgcolor=#fefefe
| 289449 ||  || — || March 3, 2005 || Catalina || CSS || FLO || align=right data-sort-value="0.76" | 760 m || 
|-id=450 bgcolor=#fefefe
| 289450 ||  || — || March 3, 2005 || Catalina || CSS || — || align=right | 1.2 km || 
|-id=451 bgcolor=#fefefe
| 289451 ||  || — || March 4, 2005 || Kitt Peak || Spacewatch || MAS || align=right data-sort-value="0.92" | 920 m || 
|-id=452 bgcolor=#E9E9E9
| 289452 ||  || — || March 4, 2005 || Kitt Peak || Spacewatch || — || align=right | 1.7 km || 
|-id=453 bgcolor=#E9E9E9
| 289453 ||  || — || March 4, 2005 || Kitt Peak || Spacewatch || BRG || align=right | 2.0 km || 
|-id=454 bgcolor=#E9E9E9
| 289454 ||  || — || March 4, 2005 || Kitt Peak || Spacewatch || — || align=right | 2.0 km || 
|-id=455 bgcolor=#fefefe
| 289455 ||  || — || March 4, 2005 || Kitt Peak || Spacewatch || — || align=right | 1.0 km || 
|-id=456 bgcolor=#fefefe
| 289456 ||  || — || March 4, 2005 || Catalina || CSS || — || align=right | 1.1 km || 
|-id=457 bgcolor=#fefefe
| 289457 ||  || — || March 4, 2005 || Catalina || CSS || — || align=right data-sort-value="0.82" | 820 m || 
|-id=458 bgcolor=#d6d6d6
| 289458 ||  || — || March 4, 2005 || Catalina || CSS || — || align=right | 3.6 km || 
|-id=459 bgcolor=#fefefe
| 289459 ||  || — || March 4, 2005 || Mount Lemmon || Mount Lemmon Survey || NYS || align=right data-sort-value="0.70" | 700 m || 
|-id=460 bgcolor=#d6d6d6
| 289460 ||  || — || March 4, 2005 || Mount Lemmon || Mount Lemmon Survey || — || align=right | 2.4 km || 
|-id=461 bgcolor=#fefefe
| 289461 ||  || — || March 4, 2005 || Mount Lemmon || Mount Lemmon Survey || MAS || align=right data-sort-value="0.73" | 730 m || 
|-id=462 bgcolor=#E9E9E9
| 289462 ||  || — || March 4, 2005 || Mount Lemmon || Mount Lemmon Survey || — || align=right | 1.7 km || 
|-id=463 bgcolor=#d6d6d6
| 289463 ||  || — || March 4, 2005 || Catalina || CSS || — || align=right | 2.0 km || 
|-id=464 bgcolor=#fefefe
| 289464 ||  || — || March 4, 2005 || Mount Lemmon || Mount Lemmon Survey || MAS || align=right data-sort-value="0.75" | 750 m || 
|-id=465 bgcolor=#d6d6d6
| 289465 ||  || — || March 7, 2005 || Socorro || LINEAR || TIR || align=right | 4.3 km || 
|-id=466 bgcolor=#E9E9E9
| 289466 ||  || — || March 7, 2005 || Socorro || LINEAR || — || align=right | 2.7 km || 
|-id=467 bgcolor=#fefefe
| 289467 ||  || — || March 7, 2005 || Socorro || LINEAR || — || align=right | 1.0 km || 
|-id=468 bgcolor=#fefefe
| 289468 ||  || — || March 7, 2005 || Socorro || LINEAR || — || align=right data-sort-value="0.91" | 910 m || 
|-id=469 bgcolor=#fefefe
| 289469 ||  || — || March 7, 2005 || Socorro || LINEAR || H || align=right data-sort-value="0.82" | 820 m || 
|-id=470 bgcolor=#fefefe
| 289470 ||  || — || March 2, 2005 || Catalina || CSS || V || align=right data-sort-value="0.93" | 930 m || 
|-id=471 bgcolor=#fefefe
| 289471 ||  || — || March 2, 2005 || Catalina || CSS || — || align=right | 1.0 km || 
|-id=472 bgcolor=#fefefe
| 289472 ||  || — || March 3, 2005 || Kitt Peak || Spacewatch || FLO || align=right data-sort-value="0.71" | 710 m || 
|-id=473 bgcolor=#E9E9E9
| 289473 ||  || — || March 3, 2005 || Kitt Peak || Spacewatch || — || align=right | 2.3 km || 
|-id=474 bgcolor=#d6d6d6
| 289474 ||  || — || March 3, 2005 || Kitt Peak || Spacewatch || KOR || align=right | 1.5 km || 
|-id=475 bgcolor=#E9E9E9
| 289475 ||  || — || March 3, 2005 || Catalina || CSS || — || align=right | 1.9 km || 
|-id=476 bgcolor=#fefefe
| 289476 ||  || — || March 3, 2005 || Catalina || CSS || — || align=right | 1.1 km || 
|-id=477 bgcolor=#fefefe
| 289477 ||  || — || March 3, 2005 || Catalina || CSS || — || align=right | 1.4 km || 
|-id=478 bgcolor=#fefefe
| 289478 ||  || — || March 3, 2005 || Catalina || CSS || — || align=right | 1.1 km || 
|-id=479 bgcolor=#fefefe
| 289479 ||  || — || March 4, 2005 || Kitt Peak || Spacewatch || MAS || align=right data-sort-value="0.97" | 970 m || 
|-id=480 bgcolor=#E9E9E9
| 289480 ||  || — || March 4, 2005 || Kitt Peak || Spacewatch || MAR || align=right | 1.2 km || 
|-id=481 bgcolor=#fefefe
| 289481 ||  || — || March 4, 2005 || Kitt Peak || Spacewatch || — || align=right data-sort-value="0.94" | 940 m || 
|-id=482 bgcolor=#E9E9E9
| 289482 ||  || — || March 4, 2005 || Socorro || LINEAR || ADE || align=right | 2.9 km || 
|-id=483 bgcolor=#E9E9E9
| 289483 ||  || — || March 4, 2005 || Mount Lemmon || Mount Lemmon Survey || — || align=right data-sort-value="0.74" | 740 m || 
|-id=484 bgcolor=#E9E9E9
| 289484 ||  || — || March 7, 2005 || Socorro || LINEAR || GEF || align=right | 1.9 km || 
|-id=485 bgcolor=#fefefe
| 289485 ||  || — || March 8, 2005 || Anderson Mesa || LONEOS || MAS || align=right | 1.0 km || 
|-id=486 bgcolor=#E9E9E9
| 289486 ||  || — || March 8, 2005 || Anderson Mesa || LONEOS || DOR || align=right | 4.3 km || 
|-id=487 bgcolor=#E9E9E9
| 289487 ||  || — || March 3, 2005 || Catalina || CSS || — || align=right | 2.4 km || 
|-id=488 bgcolor=#E9E9E9
| 289488 ||  || — || March 3, 2005 || Catalina || CSS || MIT || align=right | 3.3 km || 
|-id=489 bgcolor=#fefefe
| 289489 ||  || — || March 4, 2005 || Mount Lemmon || Mount Lemmon Survey || — || align=right | 1.0 km || 
|-id=490 bgcolor=#E9E9E9
| 289490 ||  || — || March 4, 2005 || Catalina || CSS || — || align=right | 2.5 km || 
|-id=491 bgcolor=#d6d6d6
| 289491 ||  || — || March 4, 2005 || Catalina || CSS || — || align=right | 4.1 km || 
|-id=492 bgcolor=#d6d6d6
| 289492 ||  || — || March 4, 2005 || Socorro || LINEAR || — || align=right | 4.1 km || 
|-id=493 bgcolor=#E9E9E9
| 289493 ||  || — || March 4, 2005 || Socorro || LINEAR || MIS || align=right | 3.2 km || 
|-id=494 bgcolor=#fefefe
| 289494 ||  || — || March 4, 2005 || Mount Lemmon || Mount Lemmon Survey || V || align=right data-sort-value="0.58" | 580 m || 
|-id=495 bgcolor=#fefefe
| 289495 ||  || — || March 8, 2005 || Kitt Peak || Spacewatch || — || align=right | 1.1 km || 
|-id=496 bgcolor=#E9E9E9
| 289496 ||  || — || March 9, 2005 || Kitt Peak || Spacewatch || — || align=right | 2.1 km || 
|-id=497 bgcolor=#fefefe
| 289497 ||  || — || March 9, 2005 || Anderson Mesa || LONEOS || FLO || align=right data-sort-value="0.81" | 810 m || 
|-id=498 bgcolor=#fefefe
| 289498 ||  || — || March 9, 2005 || Kitt Peak || Spacewatch || — || align=right | 1.0 km || 
|-id=499 bgcolor=#E9E9E9
| 289499 ||  || — || March 9, 2005 || Mount Lemmon || Mount Lemmon Survey || HOF || align=right | 3.0 km || 
|-id=500 bgcolor=#E9E9E9
| 289500 ||  || — || March 9, 2005 || Catalina || CSS || — || align=right | 2.9 km || 
|}

289501–289600 

|-bgcolor=#C2FFFF
| 289501 ||  || — || March 9, 2005 || Catalina || CSS || L5ENM || align=right | 18 km || 
|-id=502 bgcolor=#E9E9E9
| 289502 ||  || — || March 9, 2005 || Catalina || CSS || — || align=right | 3.4 km || 
|-id=503 bgcolor=#d6d6d6
| 289503 ||  || — || March 9, 2005 || Mount Lemmon || Mount Lemmon Survey || — || align=right | 3.4 km || 
|-id=504 bgcolor=#fefefe
| 289504 ||  || — || March 9, 2005 || Mount Lemmon || Mount Lemmon Survey || — || align=right data-sort-value="0.83" | 830 m || 
|-id=505 bgcolor=#fefefe
| 289505 ||  || — || March 9, 2005 || Socorro || LINEAR || — || align=right data-sort-value="0.89" | 890 m || 
|-id=506 bgcolor=#fefefe
| 289506 ||  || — || March 10, 2005 || Catalina || CSS || NYS || align=right data-sort-value="0.92" | 920 m || 
|-id=507 bgcolor=#E9E9E9
| 289507 ||  || — || March 10, 2005 || Kitt Peak || Spacewatch || — || align=right | 1.6 km || 
|-id=508 bgcolor=#E9E9E9
| 289508 ||  || — || March 8, 2005 || Catalina || CSS || — || align=right | 2.8 km || 
|-id=509 bgcolor=#fefefe
| 289509 ||  || — || March 8, 2005 || Mount Lemmon || Mount Lemmon Survey || — || align=right data-sort-value="0.83" | 830 m || 
|-id=510 bgcolor=#fefefe
| 289510 ||  || — || March 9, 2005 || Mount Lemmon || Mount Lemmon Survey || MAS || align=right data-sort-value="0.74" | 740 m || 
|-id=511 bgcolor=#fefefe
| 289511 ||  || — || March 9, 2005 || Mount Lemmon || Mount Lemmon Survey || — || align=right data-sort-value="0.75" | 750 m || 
|-id=512 bgcolor=#d6d6d6
| 289512 ||  || — || March 10, 2005 || Mount Lemmon || Mount Lemmon Survey || — || align=right | 2.5 km || 
|-id=513 bgcolor=#d6d6d6
| 289513 ||  || — || March 10, 2005 || Mount Lemmon || Mount Lemmon Survey || — || align=right | 1.9 km || 
|-id=514 bgcolor=#E9E9E9
| 289514 ||  || — || March 7, 2005 || Socorro || LINEAR || — || align=right | 1.5 km || 
|-id=515 bgcolor=#fefefe
| 289515 ||  || — || March 8, 2005 || Kitt Peak || Spacewatch || V || align=right data-sort-value="0.66" | 660 m || 
|-id=516 bgcolor=#E9E9E9
| 289516 ||  || — || March 8, 2005 || Kitt Peak || Spacewatch || — || align=right | 1.4 km || 
|-id=517 bgcolor=#d6d6d6
| 289517 ||  || — || March 8, 2005 || Kitt Peak || Spacewatch || — || align=right | 3.7 km || 
|-id=518 bgcolor=#fefefe
| 289518 ||  || — || March 9, 2005 || Kitt Peak || Spacewatch || — || align=right data-sort-value="0.79" | 790 m || 
|-id=519 bgcolor=#E9E9E9
| 289519 ||  || — || March 9, 2005 || Kitt Peak || Spacewatch || — || align=right | 2.9 km || 
|-id=520 bgcolor=#d6d6d6
| 289520 ||  || — || March 9, 2005 || Kitt Peak || Spacewatch || — || align=right | 2.8 km || 
|-id=521 bgcolor=#fefefe
| 289521 ||  || — || March 9, 2005 || Socorro || LINEAR || — || align=right | 1.0 km || 
|-id=522 bgcolor=#E9E9E9
| 289522 ||  || — || March 10, 2005 || Anderson Mesa || LONEOS || — || align=right | 2.1 km || 
|-id=523 bgcolor=#E9E9E9
| 289523 ||  || — || March 10, 2005 || Anderson Mesa || LONEOS || — || align=right | 3.0 km || 
|-id=524 bgcolor=#E9E9E9
| 289524 ||  || — || March 10, 2005 || Mount Lemmon || Mount Lemmon Survey || — || align=right data-sort-value="0.90" | 900 m || 
|-id=525 bgcolor=#E9E9E9
| 289525 ||  || — || March 11, 2005 || Mount Lemmon || Mount Lemmon Survey || — || align=right | 1.3 km || 
|-id=526 bgcolor=#fefefe
| 289526 ||  || — || March 11, 2005 || Mount Lemmon || Mount Lemmon Survey || — || align=right data-sort-value="0.87" | 870 m || 
|-id=527 bgcolor=#fefefe
| 289527 ||  || — || March 11, 2005 || Mount Lemmon || Mount Lemmon Survey || — || align=right data-sort-value="0.79" | 790 m || 
|-id=528 bgcolor=#d6d6d6
| 289528 ||  || — || March 11, 2005 || Mount Lemmon || Mount Lemmon Survey || — || align=right | 2.7 km || 
|-id=529 bgcolor=#E9E9E9
| 289529 ||  || — || March 11, 2005 || Kitt Peak || Spacewatch || — || align=right | 1.7 km || 
|-id=530 bgcolor=#fefefe
| 289530 ||  || — || March 12, 2005 || Mount Lemmon || Mount Lemmon Survey || V || align=right data-sort-value="0.95" | 950 m || 
|-id=531 bgcolor=#fefefe
| 289531 ||  || — || March 12, 2005 || Mount Lemmon || Mount Lemmon Survey || — || align=right data-sort-value="0.82" | 820 m || 
|-id=532 bgcolor=#d6d6d6
| 289532 ||  || — || March 11, 2005 || Kitt Peak || Spacewatch || NAE || align=right | 4.4 km || 
|-id=533 bgcolor=#d6d6d6
| 289533 ||  || — || March 11, 2005 || Kitt Peak || Spacewatch || — || align=right | 3.0 km || 
|-id=534 bgcolor=#fefefe
| 289534 ||  || — || March 13, 2005 || Catalina || CSS || NYS || align=right data-sort-value="0.88" | 880 m || 
|-id=535 bgcolor=#fefefe
| 289535 ||  || — || March 4, 2005 || Kitt Peak || Spacewatch || FLO || align=right data-sort-value="0.72" | 720 m || 
|-id=536 bgcolor=#E9E9E9
| 289536 ||  || — || March 4, 2005 || Kitt Peak || Spacewatch || XIZ || align=right | 1.3 km || 
|-id=537 bgcolor=#fefefe
| 289537 ||  || — || March 4, 2005 || Kitt Peak || Spacewatch || — || align=right | 1.0 km || 
|-id=538 bgcolor=#E9E9E9
| 289538 ||  || — || March 4, 2005 || Mount Lemmon || Mount Lemmon Survey || — || align=right | 1.1 km || 
|-id=539 bgcolor=#d6d6d6
| 289539 ||  || — || March 4, 2005 || Socorro || LINEAR || 3:2 || align=right | 5.5 km || 
|-id=540 bgcolor=#E9E9E9
| 289540 ||  || — || March 4, 2005 || Mount Lemmon || Mount Lemmon Survey || — || align=right | 1.5 km || 
|-id=541 bgcolor=#E9E9E9
| 289541 ||  || — || March 8, 2005 || Anderson Mesa || LONEOS || — || align=right | 1.4 km || 
|-id=542 bgcolor=#fefefe
| 289542 ||  || — || March 9, 2005 || Catalina || CSS || — || align=right | 1.1 km || 
|-id=543 bgcolor=#E9E9E9
| 289543 ||  || — || March 10, 2005 || Anderson Mesa || LONEOS || — || align=right | 2.3 km || 
|-id=544 bgcolor=#E9E9E9
| 289544 ||  || — || March 13, 2005 || Socorro || LINEAR || BAR || align=right | 2.1 km || 
|-id=545 bgcolor=#E9E9E9
| 289545 ||  || — || March 9, 2005 || Catalina || CSS || — || align=right | 1.6 km || 
|-id=546 bgcolor=#E9E9E9
| 289546 ||  || — || March 9, 2005 || Mount Lemmon || Mount Lemmon Survey || VIB || align=right | 2.1 km || 
|-id=547 bgcolor=#fefefe
| 289547 ||  || — || March 9, 2005 || Mount Lemmon || Mount Lemmon Survey || MAS || align=right data-sort-value="0.85" | 850 m || 
|-id=548 bgcolor=#fefefe
| 289548 ||  || — || March 10, 2005 || Mount Lemmon || Mount Lemmon Survey || — || align=right data-sort-value="0.68" | 680 m || 
|-id=549 bgcolor=#E9E9E9
| 289549 ||  || — || March 10, 2005 || Mount Lemmon || Mount Lemmon Survey || — || align=right data-sort-value="0.96" | 960 m || 
|-id=550 bgcolor=#fefefe
| 289550 ||  || — || March 10, 2005 || Mount Lemmon || Mount Lemmon Survey || — || align=right data-sort-value="0.90" | 900 m || 
|-id=551 bgcolor=#fefefe
| 289551 ||  || — || March 10, 2005 || Anderson Mesa || LONEOS || — || align=right | 1.2 km || 
|-id=552 bgcolor=#E9E9E9
| 289552 ||  || — || March 11, 2005 || Kitt Peak || Spacewatch || — || align=right | 2.0 km || 
|-id=553 bgcolor=#d6d6d6
| 289553 ||  || — || March 11, 2005 || Catalina || CSS || — || align=right | 4.1 km || 
|-id=554 bgcolor=#fefefe
| 289554 ||  || — || March 12, 2005 || Kitt Peak || Spacewatch || MAS || align=right data-sort-value="0.80" | 800 m || 
|-id=555 bgcolor=#E9E9E9
| 289555 ||  || — || March 14, 2005 || Mount Lemmon || Mount Lemmon Survey || PAE || align=right | 2.6 km || 
|-id=556 bgcolor=#E9E9E9
| 289556 ||  || — || March 10, 2005 || Mount Lemmon || Mount Lemmon Survey || HEN || align=right | 1.1 km || 
|-id=557 bgcolor=#fefefe
| 289557 ||  || — || March 13, 2005 || Socorro || LINEAR || — || align=right | 1.1 km || 
|-id=558 bgcolor=#d6d6d6
| 289558 ||  || — || March 13, 2005 || Catalina || CSS || — || align=right | 4.0 km || 
|-id=559 bgcolor=#E9E9E9
| 289559 ||  || — || March 13, 2005 || Kitt Peak || Spacewatch || GEF || align=right | 1.4 km || 
|-id=560 bgcolor=#d6d6d6
| 289560 ||  || — || March 13, 2005 || Kitt Peak || Spacewatch || — || align=right | 4.4 km || 
|-id=561 bgcolor=#E9E9E9
| 289561 ||  || — || March 14, 2005 || Mount Lemmon || Mount Lemmon Survey || — || align=right | 1.7 km || 
|-id=562 bgcolor=#fefefe
| 289562 ||  || — || March 13, 2005 || Anderson Mesa || LONEOS || — || align=right | 1.3 km || 
|-id=563 bgcolor=#fefefe
| 289563 ||  || — || March 12, 2005 || Socorro || LINEAR || — || align=right | 1.3 km || 
|-id=564 bgcolor=#d6d6d6
| 289564 ||  || — || March 1, 2005 || Kitt Peak || Spacewatch || SHU3:2 || align=right | 7.9 km || 
|-id=565 bgcolor=#fefefe
| 289565 ||  || — || March 10, 2005 || Anderson Mesa || LONEOS || — || align=right | 1.4 km || 
|-id=566 bgcolor=#d6d6d6
| 289566 ||  || — || March 11, 2005 || Kitt Peak || Spacewatch || — || align=right | 4.2 km || 
|-id=567 bgcolor=#fefefe
| 289567 ||  || — || March 9, 2005 || Catalina || CSS || FLO || align=right data-sort-value="0.91" | 910 m || 
|-id=568 bgcolor=#E9E9E9
| 289568 ||  || — || March 10, 2005 || Catalina || CSS || — || align=right | 3.5 km || 
|-id=569 bgcolor=#E9E9E9
| 289569 ||  || — || March 10, 2005 || Catalina || CSS || — || align=right | 2.9 km || 
|-id=570 bgcolor=#fefefe
| 289570 ||  || — || March 10, 2005 || Catalina || CSS || — || align=right | 1.0 km || 
|-id=571 bgcolor=#fefefe
| 289571 ||  || — || March 10, 2005 || Mount Lemmon || Mount Lemmon Survey || — || align=right | 1.1 km || 
|-id=572 bgcolor=#E9E9E9
| 289572 ||  || — || March 10, 2005 || Catalina || CSS || — || align=right | 2.2 km || 
|-id=573 bgcolor=#E9E9E9
| 289573 ||  || — || March 8, 2005 || Mount Lemmon || Mount Lemmon Survey || MAR || align=right | 1.2 km || 
|-id=574 bgcolor=#E9E9E9
| 289574 ||  || — || March 9, 2005 || Mount Lemmon || Mount Lemmon Survey || — || align=right | 1.3 km || 
|-id=575 bgcolor=#fefefe
| 289575 ||  || — || March 10, 2005 || Kitt Peak || M. W. Buie || NYS || align=right data-sort-value="0.76" | 760 m || 
|-id=576 bgcolor=#fefefe
| 289576 ||  || — || March 10, 2005 || Kitt Peak || M. W. Buie || — || align=right | 1.2 km || 
|-id=577 bgcolor=#E9E9E9
| 289577 ||  || — || March 11, 2005 || Kitt Peak || M. W. Buie || GER || align=right | 1.5 km || 
|-id=578 bgcolor=#E9E9E9
| 289578 ||  || — || March 12, 2005 || Kitt Peak || M. W. Buie || — || align=right | 2.2 km || 
|-id=579 bgcolor=#E9E9E9
| 289579 ||  || — || March 4, 2005 || Mount Lemmon || Mount Lemmon Survey || — || align=right | 2.0 km || 
|-id=580 bgcolor=#d6d6d6
| 289580 ||  || — || March 13, 2005 || Mount Lemmon || Mount Lemmon Survey || — || align=right | 3.2 km || 
|-id=581 bgcolor=#E9E9E9
| 289581 ||  || — || March 13, 2005 || Catalina || CSS || — || align=right data-sort-value="0.99" | 990 m || 
|-id=582 bgcolor=#fefefe
| 289582 ||  || — || March 16, 2005 || Kitt Peak || Spacewatch || — || align=right data-sort-value="0.77" | 770 m || 
|-id=583 bgcolor=#fefefe
| 289583 ||  || — || March 16, 2005 || Catalina || CSS || — || align=right data-sort-value="0.91" | 910 m || 
|-id=584 bgcolor=#d6d6d6
| 289584 ||  || — || March 30, 2005 || Vail-Jarnac || Jarnac Obs. || — || align=right | 5.2 km || 
|-id=585 bgcolor=#fefefe
| 289585 ||  || — || March 30, 2005 || Catalina || CSS || NYS || align=right data-sort-value="0.90" | 900 m || 
|-id=586 bgcolor=#fefefe
| 289586 Shackleton ||  ||  || March 30, 2005 || Vicques || M. Ory || NYS || align=right data-sort-value="0.80" | 800 m || 
|-id=587 bgcolor=#fefefe
| 289587 Chantdugros ||  ||  || March 30, 2005 || Vicques || M. Ory || — || align=right data-sort-value="0.87" | 870 m || 
|-id=588 bgcolor=#fefefe
| 289588 ||  || — || March 31, 2005 || Bergisch Gladbac || W. Bickel || — || align=right data-sort-value="0.93" | 930 m || 
|-id=589 bgcolor=#E9E9E9
| 289589 ||  || — || March 30, 2005 || Catalina || CSS || MIT || align=right | 2.9 km || 
|-id=590 bgcolor=#d6d6d6
| 289590 ||  || — || March 31, 2005 || Kitt Peak || Spacewatch || — || align=right | 3.7 km || 
|-id=591 bgcolor=#E9E9E9
| 289591 ||  || — || March 30, 2005 || Catalina || CSS || — || align=right | 3.5 km || 
|-id=592 bgcolor=#d6d6d6
| 289592 ||  || — || March 18, 2005 || Catalina || CSS || — || align=right | 3.3 km || 
|-id=593 bgcolor=#fefefe
| 289593 ||  || — || April 1, 2005 || Anderson Mesa || LONEOS || NYS || align=right data-sort-value="0.79" | 790 m || 
|-id=594 bgcolor=#fefefe
| 289594 ||  || — || April 1, 2005 || Anderson Mesa || LONEOS || — || align=right data-sort-value="0.96" | 960 m || 
|-id=595 bgcolor=#fefefe
| 289595 ||  || — || April 1, 2005 || Kitt Peak || Spacewatch || FLO || align=right data-sort-value="0.82" | 820 m || 
|-id=596 bgcolor=#d6d6d6
| 289596 ||  || — || April 1, 2005 || Kitt Peak || Spacewatch || EOS || align=right | 2.1 km || 
|-id=597 bgcolor=#fefefe
| 289597 ||  || — || April 1, 2005 || Kitt Peak || Spacewatch || NYS || align=right data-sort-value="0.90" | 900 m || 
|-id=598 bgcolor=#fefefe
| 289598 ||  || — || April 1, 2005 || Kitt Peak || Spacewatch || — || align=right | 1.3 km || 
|-id=599 bgcolor=#E9E9E9
| 289599 ||  || — || April 3, 2005 || Socorro || LINEAR || — || align=right | 2.7 km || 
|-id=600 bgcolor=#d6d6d6
| 289600 ||  || — || April 1, 2005 || Vicques || Jura Obs. || — || align=right | 3.4 km || 
|}

289601–289700 

|-bgcolor=#fefefe
| 289601 ||  || — || April 1, 2005 || Kitt Peak || Spacewatch || — || align=right data-sort-value="0.97" | 970 m || 
|-id=602 bgcolor=#fefefe
| 289602 ||  || — || April 1, 2005 || Kitt Peak || Spacewatch || NYS || align=right data-sort-value="0.80" | 800 m || 
|-id=603 bgcolor=#fefefe
| 289603 ||  || — || April 1, 2005 || Anderson Mesa || LONEOS || FLO || align=right data-sort-value="0.92" | 920 m || 
|-id=604 bgcolor=#fefefe
| 289604 ||  || — || April 2, 2005 || Mount Lemmon || Mount Lemmon Survey || — || align=right data-sort-value="0.75" | 750 m || 
|-id=605 bgcolor=#E9E9E9
| 289605 ||  || — || April 2, 2005 || Palomar || NEAT || AGN || align=right | 1.5 km || 
|-id=606 bgcolor=#E9E9E9
| 289606 ||  || — || April 2, 2005 || Palomar || NEAT || — || align=right | 3.2 km || 
|-id=607 bgcolor=#fefefe
| 289607 ||  || — || April 3, 2005 || Palomar || NEAT || — || align=right | 1.3 km || 
|-id=608 bgcolor=#fefefe
| 289608 Wanli ||  ||  || April 4, 2005 || San Marcello || L. Tesi, G. Fagioli || — || align=right | 1.1 km || 
|-id=609 bgcolor=#E9E9E9
| 289609 ||  || — || April 1, 2005 || Anderson Mesa || LONEOS || EUN || align=right | 1.8 km || 
|-id=610 bgcolor=#E9E9E9
| 289610 ||  || — || April 2, 2005 || Mount Lemmon || Mount Lemmon Survey || — || align=right | 1.3 km || 
|-id=611 bgcolor=#E9E9E9
| 289611 ||  || — || April 2, 2005 || Mount Lemmon || Mount Lemmon Survey || — || align=right | 2.3 km || 
|-id=612 bgcolor=#d6d6d6
| 289612 ||  || — || April 3, 2005 || Palomar || NEAT || — || align=right | 5.0 km || 
|-id=613 bgcolor=#fefefe
| 289613 ||  || — || April 3, 2005 || Palomar || NEAT || — || align=right | 1.1 km || 
|-id=614 bgcolor=#fefefe
| 289614 ||  || — || April 3, 2005 || Palomar || NEAT || — || align=right | 1.1 km || 
|-id=615 bgcolor=#fefefe
| 289615 ||  || — || April 4, 2005 || Kitt Peak || Spacewatch || — || align=right data-sort-value="0.75" | 750 m || 
|-id=616 bgcolor=#E9E9E9
| 289616 ||  || — || April 4, 2005 || Mount Lemmon || Mount Lemmon Survey || EUN || align=right data-sort-value="0.95" | 950 m || 
|-id=617 bgcolor=#E9E9E9
| 289617 ||  || — || April 4, 2005 || Mount Lemmon || Mount Lemmon Survey || HEN || align=right | 1.6 km || 
|-id=618 bgcolor=#FA8072
| 289618 ||  || — || April 4, 2005 || Catalina || CSS || — || align=right data-sort-value="0.75" | 750 m || 
|-id=619 bgcolor=#d6d6d6
| 289619 ||  || — || April 1, 2005 || Anderson Mesa || LONEOS || LIX || align=right | 4.8 km || 
|-id=620 bgcolor=#fefefe
| 289620 ||  || — || April 3, 2005 || Siding Spring || SSS || — || align=right data-sort-value="0.95" | 950 m || 
|-id=621 bgcolor=#d6d6d6
| 289621 ||  || — || April 5, 2005 || Mount Lemmon || Mount Lemmon Survey || — || align=right | 3.3 km || 
|-id=622 bgcolor=#E9E9E9
| 289622 ||  || — || April 5, 2005 || Mount Lemmon || Mount Lemmon Survey || — || align=right | 2.6 km || 
|-id=623 bgcolor=#E9E9E9
| 289623 ||  || — || April 5, 2005 || Mount Lemmon || Mount Lemmon Survey || — || align=right | 1.3 km || 
|-id=624 bgcolor=#fefefe
| 289624 ||  || — || April 2, 2005 || Palomar || NEAT || — || align=right | 1.2 km || 
|-id=625 bgcolor=#E9E9E9
| 289625 ||  || — || April 2, 2005 || Mount Lemmon || Mount Lemmon Survey || — || align=right | 2.2 km || 
|-id=626 bgcolor=#d6d6d6
| 289626 ||  || — || April 2, 2005 || Mount Lemmon || Mount Lemmon Survey || — || align=right | 2.7 km || 
|-id=627 bgcolor=#d6d6d6
| 289627 ||  || — || April 6, 2005 || Palomar || NEAT || EOS || align=right | 2.7 km || 
|-id=628 bgcolor=#fefefe
| 289628 ||  || — || April 6, 2005 || Mount Lemmon || Mount Lemmon Survey || NYS || align=right data-sort-value="0.82" | 820 m || 
|-id=629 bgcolor=#E9E9E9
| 289629 ||  || — || April 2, 2005 || Kitt Peak || Spacewatch || HEN || align=right | 1.4 km || 
|-id=630 bgcolor=#fefefe
| 289630 ||  || — || April 2, 2005 || Mount Lemmon || Mount Lemmon Survey || FLO || align=right data-sort-value="0.77" | 770 m || 
|-id=631 bgcolor=#fefefe
| 289631 ||  || — || April 4, 2005 || Catalina || CSS || — || align=right data-sort-value="0.80" | 800 m || 
|-id=632 bgcolor=#fefefe
| 289632 ||  || — || April 5, 2005 || Palomar || NEAT || — || align=right | 1.0 km || 
|-id=633 bgcolor=#fefefe
| 289633 ||  || — || April 5, 2005 || Mount Lemmon || Mount Lemmon Survey || MAS || align=right data-sort-value="0.77" | 770 m || 
|-id=634 bgcolor=#E9E9E9
| 289634 ||  || — || April 6, 2005 || Catalina || CSS || — || align=right | 3.5 km || 
|-id=635 bgcolor=#E9E9E9
| 289635 ||  || — || April 4, 2005 || Mount Lemmon || Mount Lemmon Survey || — || align=right | 1.7 km || 
|-id=636 bgcolor=#E9E9E9
| 289636 ||  || — || April 5, 2005 || Mount Lemmon || Mount Lemmon Survey || MIS || align=right | 3.2 km || 
|-id=637 bgcolor=#E9E9E9
| 289637 ||  || — || April 5, 2005 || Mount Lemmon || Mount Lemmon Survey || — || align=right data-sort-value="0.82" | 820 m || 
|-id=638 bgcolor=#d6d6d6
| 289638 ||  || — || April 6, 2005 || Kitt Peak || Spacewatch || EOS || align=right | 2.5 km || 
|-id=639 bgcolor=#fefefe
| 289639 ||  || — || April 6, 2005 || Kitt Peak || Spacewatch || — || align=right data-sort-value="0.96" | 960 m || 
|-id=640 bgcolor=#E9E9E9
| 289640 ||  || — || April 6, 2005 || Palomar || NEAT || — || align=right | 3.4 km || 
|-id=641 bgcolor=#d6d6d6
| 289641 ||  || — || April 6, 2005 || Mount Lemmon || Mount Lemmon Survey || THM || align=right | 2.9 km || 
|-id=642 bgcolor=#fefefe
| 289642 ||  || — || April 6, 2005 || Kitt Peak || Spacewatch || V || align=right data-sort-value="0.70" | 700 m || 
|-id=643 bgcolor=#fefefe
| 289643 ||  || — || April 7, 2005 || Kitt Peak || Spacewatch || FLO || align=right data-sort-value="0.72" | 720 m || 
|-id=644 bgcolor=#fefefe
| 289644 ||  || — || April 9, 2005 || Mount Lemmon || Mount Lemmon Survey || NYS || align=right data-sort-value="0.76" | 760 m || 
|-id=645 bgcolor=#d6d6d6
| 289645 ||  || — || April 9, 2005 || Mount Lemmon || Mount Lemmon Survey || Tj (2.93) || align=right | 2.5 km || 
|-id=646 bgcolor=#fefefe
| 289646 ||  || — || April 10, 2005 || Mount Lemmon || Mount Lemmon Survey || — || align=right data-sort-value="0.90" | 900 m || 
|-id=647 bgcolor=#E9E9E9
| 289647 ||  || — || April 10, 2005 || Mount Lemmon || Mount Lemmon Survey || — || align=right | 1.6 km || 
|-id=648 bgcolor=#fefefe
| 289648 ||  || — || April 10, 2005 || Mount Lemmon || Mount Lemmon Survey || — || align=right data-sort-value="0.94" | 940 m || 
|-id=649 bgcolor=#d6d6d6
| 289649 ||  || — || April 10, 2005 || Mount Lemmon || Mount Lemmon Survey || KOR || align=right | 1.5 km || 
|-id=650 bgcolor=#fefefe
| 289650 ||  || — || April 10, 2005 || Mount Lemmon || Mount Lemmon Survey || — || align=right data-sort-value="0.81" | 810 m || 
|-id=651 bgcolor=#fefefe
| 289651 ||  || — || April 10, 2005 || Mount Lemmon || Mount Lemmon Survey || MAS || align=right data-sort-value="0.76" | 760 m || 
|-id=652 bgcolor=#E9E9E9
| 289652 ||  || — || April 9, 2005 || Catalina || CSS || — || align=right | 2.8 km || 
|-id=653 bgcolor=#E9E9E9
| 289653 ||  || — || April 9, 2005 || Socorro || LINEAR || JUN || align=right | 1.6 km || 
|-id=654 bgcolor=#E9E9E9
| 289654 ||  || — || April 11, 2005 || Kitt Peak || Spacewatch || — || align=right | 1.4 km || 
|-id=655 bgcolor=#fefefe
| 289655 ||  || — || April 11, 2005 || Kitt Peak || Spacewatch || NYS || align=right data-sort-value="0.72" | 720 m || 
|-id=656 bgcolor=#d6d6d6
| 289656 ||  || — || April 11, 2005 || Mount Lemmon || Mount Lemmon Survey || — || align=right | 6.4 km || 
|-id=657 bgcolor=#fefefe
| 289657 ||  || — || April 11, 2005 || Mount Lemmon || Mount Lemmon Survey || MAS || align=right data-sort-value="0.79" | 790 m || 
|-id=658 bgcolor=#fefefe
| 289658 ||  || — || April 11, 2005 || Mount Lemmon || Mount Lemmon Survey || NYS || align=right data-sort-value="0.78" | 780 m || 
|-id=659 bgcolor=#d6d6d6
| 289659 ||  || — || April 5, 2005 || Mount Lemmon || Mount Lemmon Survey || KAR || align=right | 1.5 km || 
|-id=660 bgcolor=#d6d6d6
| 289660 ||  || — || April 7, 2005 || Kitt Peak || Spacewatch || — || align=right | 3.8 km || 
|-id=661 bgcolor=#d6d6d6
| 289661 ||  || — || April 10, 2005 || Mount Lemmon || Mount Lemmon Survey || 3:2 || align=right | 5.9 km || 
|-id=662 bgcolor=#E9E9E9
| 289662 ||  || — || April 11, 2005 || Mount Lemmon || Mount Lemmon Survey || — || align=right | 2.8 km || 
|-id=663 bgcolor=#fefefe
| 289663 ||  || — || April 12, 2005 || Mount Lemmon || Mount Lemmon Survey || NYS || align=right data-sort-value="0.78" | 780 m || 
|-id=664 bgcolor=#E9E9E9
| 289664 ||  || — || April 9, 2005 || Socorro || LINEAR || — || align=right | 4.1 km || 
|-id=665 bgcolor=#fefefe
| 289665 ||  || — || April 11, 2005 || Anderson Mesa || LONEOS || — || align=right | 1.4 km || 
|-id=666 bgcolor=#E9E9E9
| 289666 ||  || — || April 10, 2005 || Kitt Peak || Spacewatch || XIZ || align=right | 1.3 km || 
|-id=667 bgcolor=#E9E9E9
| 289667 ||  || — || April 10, 2005 || Kitt Peak || Spacewatch || — || align=right | 2.2 km || 
|-id=668 bgcolor=#fefefe
| 289668 ||  || — || April 11, 2005 || Kitt Peak || Spacewatch || — || align=right data-sort-value="0.57" | 570 m || 
|-id=669 bgcolor=#E9E9E9
| 289669 ||  || — || April 11, 2005 || Mount Lemmon || Mount Lemmon Survey || — || align=right | 2.9 km || 
|-id=670 bgcolor=#E9E9E9
| 289670 ||  || — || April 12, 2005 || Kitt Peak || Spacewatch || — || align=right | 1.8 km || 
|-id=671 bgcolor=#E9E9E9
| 289671 ||  || — || April 9, 2005 || Socorro || LINEAR || — || align=right | 1.2 km || 
|-id=672 bgcolor=#E9E9E9
| 289672 ||  || — || April 10, 2005 || Kitt Peak || Spacewatch || — || align=right | 1.3 km || 
|-id=673 bgcolor=#d6d6d6
| 289673 ||  || — || April 10, 2005 || Kitt Peak || Spacewatch || — || align=right | 3.7 km || 
|-id=674 bgcolor=#E9E9E9
| 289674 ||  || — || April 11, 2005 || Kitt Peak || Spacewatch || HOF || align=right | 3.8 km || 
|-id=675 bgcolor=#E9E9E9
| 289675 ||  || — || April 11, 2005 || Kitt Peak || Spacewatch || PAD || align=right | 2.1 km || 
|-id=676 bgcolor=#d6d6d6
| 289676 ||  || — || April 11, 2005 || Kitt Peak || Spacewatch || EUP || align=right | 3.8 km || 
|-id=677 bgcolor=#d6d6d6
| 289677 ||  || — || April 11, 2005 || Kitt Peak || Spacewatch || — || align=right | 4.5 km || 
|-id=678 bgcolor=#fefefe
| 289678 ||  || — || April 11, 2005 || Kitt Peak || Spacewatch || — || align=right | 1.0 km || 
|-id=679 bgcolor=#d6d6d6
| 289679 ||  || — || April 11, 2005 || Kitt Peak || Spacewatch || — || align=right | 2.6 km || 
|-id=680 bgcolor=#E9E9E9
| 289680 ||  || — || April 11, 2005 || Kitt Peak || Spacewatch || — || align=right | 2.4 km || 
|-id=681 bgcolor=#E9E9E9
| 289681 ||  || — || April 10, 2005 || Mount Lemmon || Mount Lemmon Survey || MRX || align=right | 1.5 km || 
|-id=682 bgcolor=#E9E9E9
| 289682 ||  || — || April 11, 2005 || Kitt Peak || Spacewatch || — || align=right | 3.0 km || 
|-id=683 bgcolor=#fefefe
| 289683 ||  || — || April 12, 2005 || Kitt Peak || Spacewatch || — || align=right | 1.3 km || 
|-id=684 bgcolor=#d6d6d6
| 289684 ||  || — || April 13, 2005 || Catalina || CSS || — || align=right | 4.4 km || 
|-id=685 bgcolor=#E9E9E9
| 289685 ||  || — || April 13, 2005 || Catalina || CSS || — || align=right | 2.5 km || 
|-id=686 bgcolor=#E9E9E9
| 289686 ||  || — || April 15, 2005 || Pla D'Arguines || Pla D'Arguines Obs. || HNS || align=right | 1.5 km || 
|-id=687 bgcolor=#E9E9E9
| 289687 ||  || — || April 10, 2005 || Mount Lemmon || Mount Lemmon Survey || — || align=right data-sort-value="0.92" | 920 m || 
|-id=688 bgcolor=#d6d6d6
| 289688 ||  || — || April 10, 2005 || Mount Lemmon || Mount Lemmon Survey || — || align=right | 3.5 km || 
|-id=689 bgcolor=#d6d6d6
| 289689 ||  || — || April 11, 2005 || Mount Lemmon || Mount Lemmon Survey || — || align=right | 2.4 km || 
|-id=690 bgcolor=#fefefe
| 289690 ||  || — || April 11, 2005 || Mount Lemmon || Mount Lemmon Survey || NYS || align=right data-sort-value="0.67" | 670 m || 
|-id=691 bgcolor=#fefefe
| 289691 ||  || — || April 11, 2005 || Mount Lemmon || Mount Lemmon Survey || — || align=right data-sort-value="0.96" | 960 m || 
|-id=692 bgcolor=#fefefe
| 289692 ||  || — || April 11, 2005 || Mount Lemmon || Mount Lemmon Survey || NYS || align=right data-sort-value="0.74" | 740 m || 
|-id=693 bgcolor=#E9E9E9
| 289693 ||  || — || April 12, 2005 || Mount Lemmon || Mount Lemmon Survey || AGN || align=right | 1.4 km || 
|-id=694 bgcolor=#d6d6d6
| 289694 ||  || — || April 14, 2005 || Kitt Peak || Spacewatch || EOS || align=right | 2.2 km || 
|-id=695 bgcolor=#E9E9E9
| 289695 ||  || — || April 14, 2005 || Kitt Peak || Spacewatch || GAL || align=right | 2.1 km || 
|-id=696 bgcolor=#d6d6d6
| 289696 ||  || — || April 15, 2005 || Kitt Peak || Spacewatch || — || align=right | 2.2 km || 
|-id=697 bgcolor=#E9E9E9
| 289697 ||  || — || April 9, 2005 || Catalina || CSS || — || align=right | 3.7 km || 
|-id=698 bgcolor=#E9E9E9
| 289698 ||  || — || April 12, 2005 || Kitt Peak || Spacewatch || — || align=right | 1.9 km || 
|-id=699 bgcolor=#E9E9E9
| 289699 ||  || — || April 9, 2005 || Mount Lemmon || Mount Lemmon Survey || XIZ || align=right | 1.4 km || 
|-id=700 bgcolor=#fefefe
| 289700 ||  || — || April 10, 2005 || Mount Lemmon || Mount Lemmon Survey || — || align=right data-sort-value="0.64" | 640 m || 
|}

289701–289800 

|-bgcolor=#E9E9E9
| 289701 ||  || — || April 11, 2005 || Kitt Peak || M. W. Buie || — || align=right | 1.3 km || 
|-id=702 bgcolor=#E9E9E9
| 289702 ||  || — || April 12, 2005 || Kitt Peak || M. W. Buie || — || align=right | 3.1 km || 
|-id=703 bgcolor=#fefefe
| 289703 ||  || — || April 14, 2005 || Kitt Peak || Spacewatch || NYS || align=right data-sort-value="0.84" | 840 m || 
|-id=704 bgcolor=#fefefe
| 289704 ||  || — || April 14, 2005 || Catalina || CSS || — || align=right data-sort-value="0.94" | 940 m || 
|-id=705 bgcolor=#fefefe
| 289705 ||  || — || April 2, 2005 || Mount Lemmon || Mount Lemmon Survey || MAS || align=right data-sort-value="0.75" | 750 m || 
|-id=706 bgcolor=#E9E9E9
| 289706 ||  || — || April 11, 2005 || Siding Spring || SSS || — || align=right | 1.4 km || 
|-id=707 bgcolor=#d6d6d6
| 289707 ||  || — || April 15, 2005 || Catalina || CSS || — || align=right | 4.0 km || 
|-id=708 bgcolor=#E9E9E9
| 289708 ||  || — || April 16, 2005 || Kitt Peak || Spacewatch || — || align=right | 1.2 km || 
|-id=709 bgcolor=#E9E9E9
| 289709 ||  || — || April 17, 2005 || Kitt Peak || Spacewatch || — || align=right | 1.5 km || 
|-id=710 bgcolor=#fefefe
| 289710 ||  || — || April 30, 2005 || Kitt Peak || Spacewatch || V || align=right data-sort-value="0.72" | 720 m || 
|-id=711 bgcolor=#fefefe
| 289711 ||  || — || April 30, 2005 || Palomar || NEAT || — || align=right | 1.1 km || 
|-id=712 bgcolor=#d6d6d6
| 289712 ||  || — || April 30, 2005 || Kitt Peak || Spacewatch || — || align=right | 3.1 km || 
|-id=713 bgcolor=#E9E9E9
| 289713 || 2005 JE || — || May 2, 2005 || Reedy Creek || J. Broughton || — || align=right | 1.5 km || 
|-id=714 bgcolor=#fefefe
| 289714 ||  || — || May 3, 2005 || Kitt Peak || Spacewatch || MAS || align=right data-sort-value="0.82" | 820 m || 
|-id=715 bgcolor=#fefefe
| 289715 ||  || — || May 3, 2005 || Kitt Peak || Spacewatch || MAS || align=right data-sort-value="0.83" | 830 m || 
|-id=716 bgcolor=#fefefe
| 289716 ||  || — || May 3, 2005 || Kitt Peak || Spacewatch || — || align=right | 1.00 km || 
|-id=717 bgcolor=#E9E9E9
| 289717 ||  || — || May 1, 2005 || Kitt Peak || Spacewatch || — || align=right | 3.0 km || 
|-id=718 bgcolor=#d6d6d6
| 289718 ||  || — || May 4, 2005 || Catalina || CSS || Tj (2.94) || align=right | 6.3 km || 
|-id=719 bgcolor=#E9E9E9
| 289719 ||  || — || May 4, 2005 || Mauna Kea || C. Veillet || — || align=right data-sort-value="0.89" | 890 m || 
|-id=720 bgcolor=#fefefe
| 289720 ||  || — || May 4, 2005 || Mauna Kea || C. Veillet || NYS || align=right data-sort-value="0.66" | 660 m || 
|-id=721 bgcolor=#fefefe
| 289721 ||  || — || May 4, 2005 || Mauna Kea || C. Veillet || — || align=right data-sort-value="0.95" | 950 m || 
|-id=722 bgcolor=#d6d6d6
| 289722 ||  || — || May 3, 2005 || Socorro || LINEAR || EOS || align=right | 3.0 km || 
|-id=723 bgcolor=#fefefe
| 289723 ||  || — || May 4, 2005 || Anderson Mesa || LONEOS || — || align=right | 1.1 km || 
|-id=724 bgcolor=#E9E9E9
| 289724 ||  || — || May 4, 2005 || Anderson Mesa || LONEOS || MAR || align=right | 1.6 km || 
|-id=725 bgcolor=#fefefe
| 289725 ||  || — || May 4, 2005 || Kitt Peak || Spacewatch || V || align=right data-sort-value="0.85" | 850 m || 
|-id=726 bgcolor=#E9E9E9
| 289726 ||  || — || May 4, 2005 || Mount Lemmon || Mount Lemmon Survey || — || align=right | 1.7 km || 
|-id=727 bgcolor=#E9E9E9
| 289727 ||  || — || May 4, 2005 || Catalina || CSS || JUN || align=right | 1.4 km || 
|-id=728 bgcolor=#E9E9E9
| 289728 ||  || — || May 5, 2005 || Mayhill || A. Lowe || BRU || align=right | 2.6 km || 
|-id=729 bgcolor=#fefefe
| 289729 ||  || — || May 3, 2005 || Kitt Peak || Spacewatch || V || align=right data-sort-value="0.74" | 740 m || 
|-id=730 bgcolor=#fefefe
| 289730 ||  || — || May 3, 2005 || Kitt Peak || Spacewatch || MAS || align=right data-sort-value="0.93" | 930 m || 
|-id=731 bgcolor=#E9E9E9
| 289731 ||  || — || May 3, 2005 || Kitt Peak || Spacewatch || — || align=right | 1.0 km || 
|-id=732 bgcolor=#E9E9E9
| 289732 ||  || — || May 3, 2005 || Kitt Peak || Spacewatch || — || align=right | 2.1 km || 
|-id=733 bgcolor=#d6d6d6
| 289733 ||  || — || May 3, 2005 || Kitt Peak || Spacewatch || — || align=right | 2.4 km || 
|-id=734 bgcolor=#C2FFFF
| 289734 ||  || — || May 3, 2005 || Kitt Peak || Spacewatch || L4 || align=right | 11 km || 
|-id=735 bgcolor=#d6d6d6
| 289735 ||  || — || May 3, 2005 || Kitt Peak || Spacewatch || — || align=right | 3.8 km || 
|-id=736 bgcolor=#fefefe
| 289736 ||  || — || May 4, 2005 || Kitt Peak || Spacewatch || — || align=right data-sort-value="0.66" | 660 m || 
|-id=737 bgcolor=#d6d6d6
| 289737 ||  || — || May 4, 2005 || Mount Lemmon || Mount Lemmon Survey || — || align=right | 2.6 km || 
|-id=738 bgcolor=#E9E9E9
| 289738 ||  || — || May 4, 2005 || Kitt Peak || Spacewatch || — || align=right | 1.2 km || 
|-id=739 bgcolor=#fefefe
| 289739 ||  || — || May 4, 2005 || Kitt Peak || Spacewatch || — || align=right data-sort-value="0.81" | 810 m || 
|-id=740 bgcolor=#E9E9E9
| 289740 ||  || — || May 4, 2005 || Kitt Peak || Spacewatch || MAR || align=right | 1.5 km || 
|-id=741 bgcolor=#fefefe
| 289741 ||  || — || May 4, 2005 || Siding Spring || SSS || H || align=right data-sort-value="0.83" | 830 m || 
|-id=742 bgcolor=#d6d6d6
| 289742 ||  || — || May 8, 2005 || Anderson Mesa || LONEOS || — || align=right | 4.2 km || 
|-id=743 bgcolor=#E9E9E9
| 289743 ||  || — || May 3, 2005 || Kitt Peak || Spacewatch || — || align=right | 3.1 km || 
|-id=744 bgcolor=#E9E9E9
| 289744 ||  || — || May 4, 2005 || Kitt Peak || Spacewatch || — || align=right | 3.1 km || 
|-id=745 bgcolor=#d6d6d6
| 289745 ||  || — || May 4, 2005 || Kitt Peak || Spacewatch || EOS || align=right | 2.3 km || 
|-id=746 bgcolor=#E9E9E9
| 289746 ||  || — || May 4, 2005 || Kitt Peak || Spacewatch || — || align=right | 2.6 km || 
|-id=747 bgcolor=#E9E9E9
| 289747 ||  || — || May 6, 2005 || Kitt Peak || Spacewatch || — || align=right | 2.9 km || 
|-id=748 bgcolor=#fefefe
| 289748 ||  || — || May 7, 2005 || Kitt Peak || Spacewatch || MAS || align=right data-sort-value="0.73" | 730 m || 
|-id=749 bgcolor=#E9E9E9
| 289749 ||  || — || May 8, 2005 || Kitt Peak || Spacewatch || HEN || align=right | 1.5 km || 
|-id=750 bgcolor=#d6d6d6
| 289750 ||  || — || May 8, 2005 || Kitt Peak || Spacewatch || 628 || align=right | 3.1 km || 
|-id=751 bgcolor=#E9E9E9
| 289751 ||  || — || May 8, 2005 || Kitt Peak || Spacewatch || — || align=right | 1.8 km || 
|-id=752 bgcolor=#fefefe
| 289752 ||  || — || May 9, 2005 || Mount Lemmon || Mount Lemmon Survey || — || align=right | 1.1 km || 
|-id=753 bgcolor=#fefefe
| 289753 ||  || — || May 2, 2005 || Catalina || CSS || H || align=right data-sort-value="0.83" | 830 m || 
|-id=754 bgcolor=#E9E9E9
| 289754 ||  || — || May 4, 2005 || Palomar || NEAT || ADE || align=right | 3.8 km || 
|-id=755 bgcolor=#E9E9E9
| 289755 ||  || — || May 4, 2005 || Palomar || NEAT || — || align=right | 2.4 km || 
|-id=756 bgcolor=#d6d6d6
| 289756 ||  || — || May 6, 2005 || Kitt Peak || Spacewatch || — || align=right | 5.5 km || 
|-id=757 bgcolor=#E9E9E9
| 289757 ||  || — || May 8, 2005 || Kitt Peak || Spacewatch || — || align=right | 1.7 km || 
|-id=758 bgcolor=#d6d6d6
| 289758 ||  || — || May 8, 2005 || Kitt Peak || Spacewatch || EOS || align=right | 2.6 km || 
|-id=759 bgcolor=#fefefe
| 289759 ||  || — || May 8, 2005 || Siding Spring || SSS || — || align=right | 1.2 km || 
|-id=760 bgcolor=#d6d6d6
| 289760 ||  || — || May 8, 2005 || Siding Spring || SSS || — || align=right | 5.0 km || 
|-id=761 bgcolor=#E9E9E9
| 289761 ||  || — || May 9, 2005 || Mount Lemmon || Mount Lemmon Survey || — || align=right | 1.6 km || 
|-id=762 bgcolor=#E9E9E9
| 289762 ||  || — || May 9, 2005 || Socorro || LINEAR || — || align=right | 2.5 km || 
|-id=763 bgcolor=#fefefe
| 289763 ||  || — || May 9, 2005 || Mount Lemmon || Mount Lemmon Survey || — || align=right data-sort-value="0.73" | 730 m || 
|-id=764 bgcolor=#E9E9E9
| 289764 ||  || — || May 10, 2005 || Kitt Peak || Spacewatch || — || align=right | 1.1 km || 
|-id=765 bgcolor=#E9E9E9
| 289765 ||  || — || May 4, 2005 || Catalina || CSS || — || align=right | 1.2 km || 
|-id=766 bgcolor=#d6d6d6
| 289766 ||  || — || May 9, 2005 || Kitt Peak || Spacewatch || — || align=right | 4.1 km || 
|-id=767 bgcolor=#fefefe
| 289767 ||  || — || May 8, 2005 || Mount Lemmon || Mount Lemmon Survey || — || align=right | 1.0 km || 
|-id=768 bgcolor=#fefefe
| 289768 ||  || — || May 8, 2005 || Kitt Peak || Spacewatch || V || align=right data-sort-value="0.77" | 770 m || 
|-id=769 bgcolor=#fefefe
| 289769 ||  || — || May 9, 2005 || Catalina || CSS || — || align=right | 1.1 km || 
|-id=770 bgcolor=#fefefe
| 289770 ||  || — || May 11, 2005 || Mount Lemmon || Mount Lemmon Survey || — || align=right data-sort-value="0.91" | 910 m || 
|-id=771 bgcolor=#fefefe
| 289771 ||  || — || May 10, 2005 || Mount Lemmon || Mount Lemmon Survey || V || align=right data-sort-value="0.85" | 850 m || 
|-id=772 bgcolor=#fefefe
| 289772 ||  || — || May 11, 2005 || Palomar || NEAT || V || align=right data-sort-value="0.87" | 870 m || 
|-id=773 bgcolor=#E9E9E9
| 289773 ||  || — || May 11, 2005 || Palomar || NEAT || BRG || align=right | 2.2 km || 
|-id=774 bgcolor=#E9E9E9
| 289774 ||  || — || May 11, 2005 || Palomar || NEAT || — || align=right | 2.0 km || 
|-id=775 bgcolor=#fefefe
| 289775 ||  || — || May 8, 2005 || Kitt Peak || Spacewatch || NYS || align=right data-sort-value="0.90" | 900 m || 
|-id=776 bgcolor=#E9E9E9
| 289776 ||  || — || May 8, 2005 || Anderson Mesa || LONEOS || — || align=right | 1.8 km || 
|-id=777 bgcolor=#E9E9E9
| 289777 ||  || — || May 8, 2005 || Kitt Peak || Spacewatch || HOF || align=right | 3.8 km || 
|-id=778 bgcolor=#E9E9E9
| 289778 ||  || — || May 8, 2005 || Kitt Peak || Spacewatch || — || align=right | 1.7 km || 
|-id=779 bgcolor=#E9E9E9
| 289779 ||  || — || May 9, 2005 || Kitt Peak || Spacewatch || — || align=right | 2.2 km || 
|-id=780 bgcolor=#E9E9E9
| 289780 ||  || — || May 9, 2005 || Kitt Peak || Spacewatch || — || align=right | 1.4 km || 
|-id=781 bgcolor=#E9E9E9
| 289781 ||  || — || May 9, 2005 || Anderson Mesa || LONEOS || — || align=right | 3.4 km || 
|-id=782 bgcolor=#E9E9E9
| 289782 ||  || — || May 9, 2005 || Kitt Peak || Spacewatch || DOR || align=right | 2.0 km || 
|-id=783 bgcolor=#d6d6d6
| 289783 ||  || — || May 9, 2005 || Kitt Peak || Spacewatch || — || align=right | 4.3 km || 
|-id=784 bgcolor=#d6d6d6
| 289784 ||  || — || May 9, 2005 || Kitt Peak || Spacewatch || EOS || align=right | 2.4 km || 
|-id=785 bgcolor=#E9E9E9
| 289785 ||  || — || May 11, 2005 || Mount Lemmon || Mount Lemmon Survey || — || align=right | 1.6 km || 
|-id=786 bgcolor=#E9E9E9
| 289786 ||  || — || May 11, 2005 || Mount Lemmon || Mount Lemmon Survey || — || align=right | 1.1 km || 
|-id=787 bgcolor=#E9E9E9
| 289787 ||  || — || May 11, 2005 || Mount Lemmon || Mount Lemmon Survey || — || align=right data-sort-value="0.88" | 880 m || 
|-id=788 bgcolor=#d6d6d6
| 289788 ||  || — || May 12, 2005 || Bergisch Gladbac || Bergisch Gladbach Obs. || TEL || align=right | 1.4 km || 
|-id=789 bgcolor=#fefefe
| 289789 ||  || — || May 8, 2005 || Kitt Peak || Spacewatch || — || align=right data-sort-value="0.72" | 720 m || 
|-id=790 bgcolor=#C2FFFF
| 289790 ||  || — || May 9, 2005 || Kitt Peak || Spacewatch || L4 || align=right | 13 km || 
|-id=791 bgcolor=#d6d6d6
| 289791 ||  || — || May 10, 2005 || Kitt Peak || Spacewatch || EOS || align=right | 4.1 km || 
|-id=792 bgcolor=#d6d6d6
| 289792 ||  || — || May 10, 2005 || Kitt Peak || Spacewatch || BRA || align=right | 1.7 km || 
|-id=793 bgcolor=#E9E9E9
| 289793 ||  || — || May 10, 2005 || Mount Lemmon || Mount Lemmon Survey || — || align=right | 2.7 km || 
|-id=794 bgcolor=#d6d6d6
| 289794 ||  || — || May 10, 2005 || Kitt Peak || Spacewatch || EOS || align=right | 2.0 km || 
|-id=795 bgcolor=#d6d6d6
| 289795 ||  || — || May 10, 2005 || Kitt Peak || Spacewatch || — || align=right | 3.6 km || 
|-id=796 bgcolor=#E9E9E9
| 289796 ||  || — || May 12, 2005 || Kitt Peak || Spacewatch || — || align=right | 3.6 km || 
|-id=797 bgcolor=#d6d6d6
| 289797 ||  || — || May 13, 2005 || Kitt Peak || Spacewatch || — || align=right | 3.5 km || 
|-id=798 bgcolor=#fefefe
| 289798 ||  || — || May 13, 2005 || Socorro || LINEAR || — || align=right data-sort-value="0.97" | 970 m || 
|-id=799 bgcolor=#fefefe
| 289799 ||  || — || May 13, 2005 || Kitt Peak || Spacewatch || FLO || align=right data-sort-value="0.67" | 670 m || 
|-id=800 bgcolor=#d6d6d6
| 289800 ||  || — || May 13, 2005 || Kitt Peak || Spacewatch || — || align=right | 3.3 km || 
|}

289801–289900 

|-bgcolor=#fefefe
| 289801 ||  || — || May 14, 2005 || Kitt Peak || Spacewatch || — || align=right | 1.1 km || 
|-id=802 bgcolor=#d6d6d6
| 289802 ||  || — || May 11, 2005 || Catalina || CSS || — || align=right | 4.2 km || 
|-id=803 bgcolor=#E9E9E9
| 289803 ||  || — || May 15, 2005 || Palomar || NEAT || — || align=right | 2.1 km || 
|-id=804 bgcolor=#d6d6d6
| 289804 ||  || — || May 13, 2005 || Catalina || CSS || — || align=right | 2.6 km || 
|-id=805 bgcolor=#fefefe
| 289805 ||  || — || May 3, 2005 || Kitt Peak || Spacewatch || V || align=right data-sort-value="0.66" | 660 m || 
|-id=806 bgcolor=#d6d6d6
| 289806 ||  || — || May 3, 2005 || Kitt Peak || Spacewatch || — || align=right | 3.5 km || 
|-id=807 bgcolor=#E9E9E9
| 289807 ||  || — || May 4, 2005 || Mount Lemmon || Mount Lemmon Survey || — || align=right | 1.8 km || 
|-id=808 bgcolor=#E9E9E9
| 289808 ||  || — || May 4, 2005 || Kitt Peak || Spacewatch || PAD || align=right | 2.4 km || 
|-id=809 bgcolor=#d6d6d6
| 289809 ||  || — || May 7, 2005 || Mount Lemmon || Mount Lemmon Survey || — || align=right | 3.1 km || 
|-id=810 bgcolor=#E9E9E9
| 289810 ||  || — || May 10, 2005 || Kitt Peak || Spacewatch || — || align=right data-sort-value="0.97" | 970 m || 
|-id=811 bgcolor=#E9E9E9
| 289811 ||  || — || May 6, 2005 || Catalina || CSS || MAR || align=right | 1.4 km || 
|-id=812 bgcolor=#E9E9E9
| 289812 ||  || — || May 10, 2005 || Cerro Tololo || M. W. Buie || — || align=right | 2.5 km || 
|-id=813 bgcolor=#fefefe
| 289813 ||  || — || May 10, 2005 || Cerro Tololo || M. W. Buie || MAS || align=right data-sort-value="0.82" | 820 m || 
|-id=814 bgcolor=#d6d6d6
| 289814 ||  || — || May 7, 2005 || Catalina || CSS || EUP || align=right | 5.0 km || 
|-id=815 bgcolor=#fefefe
| 289815 ||  || — || May 4, 2005 || Mount Lemmon || Mount Lemmon Survey || — || align=right data-sort-value="0.79" | 790 m || 
|-id=816 bgcolor=#E9E9E9
| 289816 ||  || — || May 14, 2005 || Palomar || NEAT || MRX || align=right | 1.4 km || 
|-id=817 bgcolor=#fefefe
| 289817 ||  || — || May 16, 2005 || Socorro || LINEAR || — || align=right data-sort-value="0.95" | 950 m || 
|-id=818 bgcolor=#fefefe
| 289818 ||  || — || May 16, 2005 || Palomar || NEAT || — || align=right | 1.0 km || 
|-id=819 bgcolor=#fefefe
| 289819 ||  || — || May 17, 2005 || Mount Lemmon || Mount Lemmon Survey || — || align=right | 1.0 km || 
|-id=820 bgcolor=#E9E9E9
| 289820 ||  || — || May 17, 2005 || Mount Lemmon || Mount Lemmon Survey || — || align=right | 2.3 km || 
|-id=821 bgcolor=#E9E9E9
| 289821 ||  || — || May 17, 2005 || Mount Lemmon || Mount Lemmon Survey || — || align=right | 2.3 km || 
|-id=822 bgcolor=#E9E9E9
| 289822 ||  || — || May 16, 2005 || Palomar || NEAT || — || align=right | 3.4 km || 
|-id=823 bgcolor=#fefefe
| 289823 ||  || — || May 20, 2005 || Mount Lemmon || Mount Lemmon Survey || NYS || align=right data-sort-value="0.87" | 870 m || 
|-id=824 bgcolor=#E9E9E9
| 289824 ||  || — || May 30, 2005 || La Silla || G. Bourban, R. Behrend || — || align=right | 1.5 km || 
|-id=825 bgcolor=#E9E9E9
| 289825 ||  || — || May 16, 2005 || Kitt Peak || Spacewatch || — || align=right | 2.8 km || 
|-id=826 bgcolor=#d6d6d6
| 289826 ||  || — || May 21, 2005 || Mount Lemmon || Mount Lemmon Survey || — || align=right | 3.3 km || 
|-id=827 bgcolor=#E9E9E9
| 289827 ||  || — || June 1, 2005 || Catalina || CSS || — || align=right | 2.2 km || 
|-id=828 bgcolor=#d6d6d6
| 289828 ||  || — || June 1, 2005 || Kitt Peak || Spacewatch || — || align=right | 4.1 km || 
|-id=829 bgcolor=#fefefe
| 289829 ||  || — || June 1, 2005 || Kitt Peak || Spacewatch || — || align=right | 1.0 km || 
|-id=830 bgcolor=#d6d6d6
| 289830 ||  || — || June 3, 2005 || Kitt Peak || Spacewatch || — || align=right | 3.5 km || 
|-id=831 bgcolor=#E9E9E9
| 289831 ||  || — || June 5, 2005 || Socorro || LINEAR || — || align=right | 4.8 km || 
|-id=832 bgcolor=#d6d6d6
| 289832 ||  || — || June 5, 2005 || Kitt Peak || Spacewatch || — || align=right | 4.9 km || 
|-id=833 bgcolor=#fefefe
| 289833 ||  || — || June 6, 2005 || Kitt Peak || Spacewatch || V || align=right data-sort-value="0.83" | 830 m || 
|-id=834 bgcolor=#E9E9E9
| 289834 ||  || — || June 5, 2005 || Kitt Peak || Spacewatch || — || align=right | 1.2 km || 
|-id=835 bgcolor=#E9E9E9
| 289835 ||  || — || June 10, 2005 || Kitt Peak || Spacewatch || — || align=right | 2.9 km || 
|-id=836 bgcolor=#d6d6d6
| 289836 ||  || — || June 8, 2005 || Kitt Peak || Spacewatch || — || align=right | 3.3 km || 
|-id=837 bgcolor=#fefefe
| 289837 ||  || — || June 8, 2005 || Kitt Peak || Spacewatch || — || align=right data-sort-value="0.84" | 840 m || 
|-id=838 bgcolor=#C2FFFF
| 289838 ||  || — || June 8, 2005 || Kitt Peak || Spacewatch || L4 || align=right | 9.5 km || 
|-id=839 bgcolor=#d6d6d6
| 289839 ||  || — || June 11, 2005 || Kitt Peak || Spacewatch || — || align=right | 2.7 km || 
|-id=840 bgcolor=#fefefe
| 289840 ||  || — || June 10, 2005 || Kitt Peak || Spacewatch || NYS || align=right data-sort-value="0.66" | 660 m || 
|-id=841 bgcolor=#d6d6d6
| 289841 ||  || — || June 10, 2005 || Kitt Peak || Spacewatch || EOS || align=right | 2.2 km || 
|-id=842 bgcolor=#fefefe
| 289842 ||  || — || June 10, 2005 || Kitt Peak || Spacewatch || — || align=right data-sort-value="0.86" | 860 m || 
|-id=843 bgcolor=#d6d6d6
| 289843 ||  || — || June 11, 2005 || Kitt Peak || Spacewatch || — || align=right | 3.8 km || 
|-id=844 bgcolor=#fefefe
| 289844 ||  || — || June 10, 2005 || Kitt Peak || Spacewatch || — || align=right data-sort-value="0.84" | 840 m || 
|-id=845 bgcolor=#E9E9E9
| 289845 ||  || — || June 11, 2005 || Catalina || CSS || — || align=right | 1.4 km || 
|-id=846 bgcolor=#d6d6d6
| 289846 ||  || — || June 10, 2005 || Kitt Peak || Spacewatch || — || align=right | 6.2 km || 
|-id=847 bgcolor=#E9E9E9
| 289847 ||  || — || June 10, 2005 || Reedy Creek || J. Broughton || MIT || align=right | 4.2 km || 
|-id=848 bgcolor=#fefefe
| 289848 ||  || — || June 10, 2005 || Kitt Peak || Spacewatch || — || align=right | 1.2 km || 
|-id=849 bgcolor=#E9E9E9
| 289849 ||  || — || June 15, 2005 || Kitt Peak || Spacewatch || — || align=right | 1.8 km || 
|-id=850 bgcolor=#fefefe
| 289850 ||  || — || June 15, 2005 || Mount Lemmon || Mount Lemmon Survey || — || align=right | 1.1 km || 
|-id=851 bgcolor=#d6d6d6
| 289851 ||  || — || June 20, 2005 || Palomar || NEAT || — || align=right | 3.3 km || 
|-id=852 bgcolor=#fefefe
| 289852 ||  || — || June 24, 2005 || Palomar || NEAT || — || align=right data-sort-value="0.90" | 900 m || 
|-id=853 bgcolor=#d6d6d6
| 289853 ||  || — || June 21, 2005 || Palomar || NEAT || MEL || align=right | 6.0 km || 
|-id=854 bgcolor=#E9E9E9
| 289854 ||  || — || June 27, 2005 || Kitt Peak || Spacewatch || — || align=right | 2.3 km || 
|-id=855 bgcolor=#fefefe
| 289855 ||  || — || June 28, 2005 || Palomar || NEAT || V || align=right data-sort-value="0.98" | 980 m || 
|-id=856 bgcolor=#E9E9E9
| 289856 ||  || — || June 28, 2005 || Kitt Peak || Spacewatch || HNA || align=right | 2.5 km || 
|-id=857 bgcolor=#E9E9E9
| 289857 ||  || — || June 28, 2005 || Kitt Peak || Spacewatch || — || align=right | 2.3 km || 
|-id=858 bgcolor=#d6d6d6
| 289858 ||  || — || June 28, 2005 || Palomar || NEAT || — || align=right | 4.0 km || 
|-id=859 bgcolor=#d6d6d6
| 289859 ||  || — || June 23, 2005 || Palomar || NEAT || — || align=right | 3.7 km || 
|-id=860 bgcolor=#E9E9E9
| 289860 ||  || — || June 27, 2005 || Kitt Peak || Spacewatch || — || align=right | 1.8 km || 
|-id=861 bgcolor=#C2FFFF
| 289861 ||  || — || June 27, 2005 || Kitt Peak || Spacewatch || L4 || align=right | 15 km || 
|-id=862 bgcolor=#fefefe
| 289862 ||  || — || June 28, 2005 || Palomar || NEAT || V || align=right data-sort-value="0.84" | 840 m || 
|-id=863 bgcolor=#d6d6d6
| 289863 ||  || — || June 28, 2005 || Palomar || NEAT || — || align=right | 4.5 km || 
|-id=864 bgcolor=#E9E9E9
| 289864 ||  || — || June 28, 2005 || Kitt Peak || Spacewatch || — || align=right | 2.0 km || 
|-id=865 bgcolor=#E9E9E9
| 289865 ||  || — || June 24, 2005 || Palomar || NEAT || HNS || align=right | 1.5 km || 
|-id=866 bgcolor=#fefefe
| 289866 ||  || — || June 30, 2005 || Junk Bond || D. Healy || FLO || align=right data-sort-value="0.70" | 700 m || 
|-id=867 bgcolor=#fefefe
| 289867 ||  || — || June 28, 2005 || Mount Lemmon || Mount Lemmon Survey || — || align=right data-sort-value="0.91" | 910 m || 
|-id=868 bgcolor=#d6d6d6
| 289868 ||  || — || June 24, 2005 || Palomar || NEAT || ALA || align=right | 5.1 km || 
|-id=869 bgcolor=#fefefe
| 289869 ||  || — || June 27, 2005 || Kitt Peak || Spacewatch || — || align=right data-sort-value="0.83" | 830 m || 
|-id=870 bgcolor=#fefefe
| 289870 ||  || — || June 27, 2005 || Kitt Peak || Spacewatch || NYS || align=right data-sort-value="0.82" | 820 m || 
|-id=871 bgcolor=#d6d6d6
| 289871 ||  || — || June 27, 2005 || Kitt Peak || Spacewatch || — || align=right | 3.6 km || 
|-id=872 bgcolor=#d6d6d6
| 289872 ||  || — || June 30, 2005 || Kitt Peak || Spacewatch || — || align=right | 3.8 km || 
|-id=873 bgcolor=#E9E9E9
| 289873 ||  || — || June 30, 2005 || Palomar || NEAT || — || align=right | 1.2 km || 
|-id=874 bgcolor=#d6d6d6
| 289874 ||  || — || June 30, 2005 || Kitt Peak || Spacewatch || EOS || align=right | 2.9 km || 
|-id=875 bgcolor=#d6d6d6
| 289875 ||  || — || June 30, 2005 || Kitt Peak || Spacewatch || THM || align=right | 2.5 km || 
|-id=876 bgcolor=#d6d6d6
| 289876 ||  || — || June 24, 2005 || Palomar || NEAT || — || align=right | 4.9 km || 
|-id=877 bgcolor=#fefefe
| 289877 ||  || — || June 26, 2005 || Mount Lemmon || Mount Lemmon Survey || FLO || align=right data-sort-value="0.73" | 730 m || 
|-id=878 bgcolor=#fefefe
| 289878 ||  || — || June 28, 2005 || Palomar || NEAT || ERI || align=right | 1.7 km || 
|-id=879 bgcolor=#E9E9E9
| 289879 ||  || — || June 27, 2005 || Kitt Peak || Spacewatch || WIT || align=right | 1.3 km || 
|-id=880 bgcolor=#E9E9E9
| 289880 ||  || — || June 27, 2005 || Kitt Peak || Spacewatch || WIT || align=right | 1.4 km || 
|-id=881 bgcolor=#fefefe
| 289881 ||  || — || June 27, 2005 || Kitt Peak || Spacewatch || — || align=right | 1.3 km || 
|-id=882 bgcolor=#E9E9E9
| 289882 ||  || — || June 28, 2005 || Kitt Peak || Spacewatch || — || align=right | 2.0 km || 
|-id=883 bgcolor=#fefefe
| 289883 ||  || — || June 29, 2005 || Kitt Peak || Spacewatch || V || align=right data-sort-value="0.74" | 740 m || 
|-id=884 bgcolor=#d6d6d6
| 289884 ||  || — || June 29, 2005 || Kitt Peak || Spacewatch || URS || align=right | 3.8 km || 
|-id=885 bgcolor=#fefefe
| 289885 ||  || — || June 29, 2005 || Kitt Peak || Spacewatch || V || align=right data-sort-value="0.71" | 710 m || 
|-id=886 bgcolor=#d6d6d6
| 289886 ||  || — || June 29, 2005 || Kitt Peak || Spacewatch || — || align=right | 3.5 km || 
|-id=887 bgcolor=#fefefe
| 289887 ||  || — || June 30, 2005 || Kitt Peak || Spacewatch || NYS || align=right data-sort-value="0.65" | 650 m || 
|-id=888 bgcolor=#E9E9E9
| 289888 ||  || — || June 28, 2005 || Palomar || NEAT || — || align=right | 2.1 km || 
|-id=889 bgcolor=#d6d6d6
| 289889 ||  || — || June 28, 2005 || Palomar || NEAT || EOS || align=right | 3.7 km || 
|-id=890 bgcolor=#d6d6d6
| 289890 ||  || — || June 28, 2005 || Palomar || NEAT || — || align=right | 4.7 km || 
|-id=891 bgcolor=#E9E9E9
| 289891 ||  || — || June 29, 2005 || Kitt Peak || Spacewatch || RAF || align=right | 1.2 km || 
|-id=892 bgcolor=#fefefe
| 289892 ||  || — || June 29, 2005 || Palomar || NEAT || FLO || align=right data-sort-value="0.76" | 760 m || 
|-id=893 bgcolor=#fefefe
| 289893 ||  || — || June 30, 2005 || Kitt Peak || Spacewatch || — || align=right data-sort-value="0.98" | 980 m || 
|-id=894 bgcolor=#E9E9E9
| 289894 ||  || — || June 30, 2005 || Kitt Peak || Spacewatch || BRU || align=right | 2.5 km || 
|-id=895 bgcolor=#fefefe
| 289895 ||  || — || June 30, 2005 || Kitt Peak || Spacewatch || NYS || align=right data-sort-value="0.78" | 780 m || 
|-id=896 bgcolor=#d6d6d6
| 289896 ||  || — || June 29, 2005 || Kitt Peak || Spacewatch || — || align=right | 3.2 km || 
|-id=897 bgcolor=#E9E9E9
| 289897 ||  || — || June 27, 2005 || Kitt Peak || Spacewatch || EUN || align=right | 1.5 km || 
|-id=898 bgcolor=#E9E9E9
| 289898 ||  || — || June 28, 2005 || Kitt Peak || Spacewatch || — || align=right | 1.1 km || 
|-id=899 bgcolor=#d6d6d6
| 289899 ||  || — || June 28, 2005 || Kitt Peak || Spacewatch || — || align=right | 5.3 km || 
|-id=900 bgcolor=#fefefe
| 289900 ||  || — || June 29, 2005 || Kitt Peak || Spacewatch || NYS || align=right | 1.8 km || 
|}

289901–290000 

|-bgcolor=#fefefe
| 289901 ||  || — || June 17, 2005 || Mount Lemmon || Mount Lemmon Survey || — || align=right data-sort-value="0.84" | 840 m || 
|-id=902 bgcolor=#fefefe
| 289902 ||  || — || June 18, 2005 || Mount Lemmon || Mount Lemmon Survey || NYS || align=right data-sort-value="0.76" | 760 m || 
|-id=903 bgcolor=#d6d6d6
| 289903 ||  || — || June 30, 2005 || Anderson Mesa || LONEOS || — || align=right | 5.6 km || 
|-id=904 bgcolor=#E9E9E9
| 289904 ||  || — || July 2, 2005 || Kitt Peak || Spacewatch || — || align=right | 3.3 km || 
|-id=905 bgcolor=#fefefe
| 289905 ||  || — || July 1, 2005 || Kitt Peak || Spacewatch || — || align=right | 1.2 km || 
|-id=906 bgcolor=#d6d6d6
| 289906 ||  || — || July 3, 2005 || Mount Lemmon || Mount Lemmon Survey || — || align=right | 2.8 km || 
|-id=907 bgcolor=#E9E9E9
| 289907 ||  || — || July 4, 2005 || Mount Lemmon || Mount Lemmon Survey || — || align=right | 1.2 km || 
|-id=908 bgcolor=#d6d6d6
| 289908 ||  || — || July 1, 2005 || Kitt Peak || Spacewatch || — || align=right | 3.1 km || 
|-id=909 bgcolor=#E9E9E9
| 289909 ||  || — || July 1, 2005 || Kitt Peak || Spacewatch || — || align=right | 2.3 km || 
|-id=910 bgcolor=#fefefe
| 289910 ||  || — || July 4, 2005 || Kitt Peak || Spacewatch || — || align=right | 1.0 km || 
|-id=911 bgcolor=#E9E9E9
| 289911 ||  || — || July 4, 2005 || Mount Lemmon || Mount Lemmon Survey || NEM || align=right | 2.4 km || 
|-id=912 bgcolor=#fefefe
| 289912 ||  || — || July 4, 2005 || Mount Lemmon || Mount Lemmon Survey || — || align=right | 1.1 km || 
|-id=913 bgcolor=#d6d6d6
| 289913 ||  || — || July 4, 2005 || Campo Imperatore || CINEOS || — || align=right | 4.4 km || 
|-id=914 bgcolor=#E9E9E9
| 289914 ||  || — || July 5, 2005 || Kitt Peak || Spacewatch || GAL || align=right | 2.1 km || 
|-id=915 bgcolor=#d6d6d6
| 289915 ||  || — || July 5, 2005 || Mount Lemmon || Mount Lemmon Survey || 7:4 || align=right | 6.1 km || 
|-id=916 bgcolor=#E9E9E9
| 289916 ||  || — || July 5, 2005 || Siding Spring || SSS || — || align=right | 2.7 km || 
|-id=917 bgcolor=#d6d6d6
| 289917 ||  || — || July 1, 2005 || Kitt Peak || Spacewatch || — || align=right | 4.9 km || 
|-id=918 bgcolor=#d6d6d6
| 289918 ||  || — || July 1, 2005 || Kitt Peak || Spacewatch || — || align=right | 4.8 km || 
|-id=919 bgcolor=#d6d6d6
| 289919 ||  || — || July 4, 2005 || Kitt Peak || Spacewatch || URS || align=right | 3.1 km || 
|-id=920 bgcolor=#d6d6d6
| 289920 ||  || — || July 4, 2005 || Kitt Peak || Spacewatch || — || align=right | 3.4 km || 
|-id=921 bgcolor=#E9E9E9
| 289921 ||  || — || July 4, 2005 || Kitt Peak || Spacewatch || — || align=right | 1.2 km || 
|-id=922 bgcolor=#d6d6d6
| 289922 ||  || — || July 5, 2005 || Mount Lemmon || Mount Lemmon Survey || — || align=right | 4.1 km || 
|-id=923 bgcolor=#fefefe
| 289923 ||  || — || July 5, 2005 || Palomar || NEAT || — || align=right data-sort-value="0.91" | 910 m || 
|-id=924 bgcolor=#E9E9E9
| 289924 ||  || — || July 5, 2005 || Palomar || NEAT || — || align=right | 1.7 km || 
|-id=925 bgcolor=#E9E9E9
| 289925 ||  || — || July 5, 2005 || Palomar || NEAT || — || align=right | 2.1 km || 
|-id=926 bgcolor=#E9E9E9
| 289926 ||  || — || July 3, 2005 || Mount Lemmon || Mount Lemmon Survey || — || align=right | 1.1 km || 
|-id=927 bgcolor=#fefefe
| 289927 ||  || — || July 4, 2005 || Kitt Peak || Spacewatch || NYS || align=right data-sort-value="0.88" | 880 m || 
|-id=928 bgcolor=#E9E9E9
| 289928 ||  || — || July 5, 2005 || Kitt Peak || Spacewatch || — || align=right | 2.4 km || 
|-id=929 bgcolor=#d6d6d6
| 289929 ||  || — || July 5, 2005 || Kitt Peak || Spacewatch || — || align=right | 4.5 km || 
|-id=930 bgcolor=#E9E9E9
| 289930 ||  || — || July 5, 2005 || Kitt Peak || Spacewatch || — || align=right | 1.5 km || 
|-id=931 bgcolor=#d6d6d6
| 289931 ||  || — || July 5, 2005 || Palomar || NEAT || — || align=right | 4.1 km || 
|-id=932 bgcolor=#E9E9E9
| 289932 ||  || — || July 5, 2005 || Kitt Peak || Spacewatch || AST || align=right | 1.6 km || 
|-id=933 bgcolor=#d6d6d6
| 289933 ||  || — || July 5, 2005 || Kitt Peak || Spacewatch || THM || align=right | 2.3 km || 
|-id=934 bgcolor=#E9E9E9
| 289934 ||  || — || July 5, 2005 || Kitt Peak || Spacewatch || — || align=right | 1.4 km || 
|-id=935 bgcolor=#d6d6d6
| 289935 ||  || — || July 5, 2005 || Kitt Peak || Spacewatch || THM || align=right | 2.4 km || 
|-id=936 bgcolor=#fefefe
| 289936 ||  || — || July 5, 2005 || Mount Lemmon || Mount Lemmon Survey || — || align=right data-sort-value="0.71" | 710 m || 
|-id=937 bgcolor=#E9E9E9
| 289937 ||  || — || July 5, 2005 || Mount Lemmon || Mount Lemmon Survey || — || align=right | 2.1 km || 
|-id=938 bgcolor=#d6d6d6
| 289938 ||  || — || July 6, 2005 || Kitt Peak || Spacewatch || — || align=right | 3.9 km || 
|-id=939 bgcolor=#fefefe
| 289939 ||  || — || July 3, 2005 || Mount Lemmon || Mount Lemmon Survey || — || align=right data-sort-value="0.96" | 960 m || 
|-id=940 bgcolor=#d6d6d6
| 289940 ||  || — || July 4, 2005 || Mount Lemmon || Mount Lemmon Survey || — || align=right | 3.9 km || 
|-id=941 bgcolor=#d6d6d6
| 289941 ||  || — || July 6, 2005 || Kitt Peak || Spacewatch || — || align=right | 2.5 km || 
|-id=942 bgcolor=#E9E9E9
| 289942 ||  || — || July 6, 2005 || Kitt Peak || Spacewatch || — || align=right | 2.1 km || 
|-id=943 bgcolor=#fefefe
| 289943 ||  || — || July 4, 2005 || Palomar || NEAT || — || align=right data-sort-value="0.94" | 940 m || 
|-id=944 bgcolor=#d6d6d6
| 289944 ||  || — || July 5, 2005 || Palomar || NEAT || — || align=right | 4.8 km || 
|-id=945 bgcolor=#E9E9E9
| 289945 ||  || — || July 6, 2005 || Kitt Peak || Spacewatch || — || align=right | 1.7 km || 
|-id=946 bgcolor=#d6d6d6
| 289946 ||  || — || July 4, 2005 || Mount Lemmon || Mount Lemmon Survey || — || align=right | 3.8 km || 
|-id=947 bgcolor=#d6d6d6
| 289947 ||  || — || July 4, 2005 || Mount Lemmon || Mount Lemmon Survey || HIL3:2 || align=right | 8.7 km || 
|-id=948 bgcolor=#d6d6d6
| 289948 ||  || — || July 5, 2005 || Kitt Peak || Spacewatch || VER || align=right | 3.0 km || 
|-id=949 bgcolor=#fefefe
| 289949 ||  || — || July 10, 2005 || Catalina || CSS || — || align=right | 3.7 km || 
|-id=950 bgcolor=#fefefe
| 289950 ||  || — || July 10, 2005 || Kitt Peak || Spacewatch || — || align=right data-sort-value="0.82" | 820 m || 
|-id=951 bgcolor=#fefefe
| 289951 ||  || — || July 5, 2005 || Mount Lemmon || Mount Lemmon Survey || NYS || align=right data-sort-value="0.76" | 760 m || 
|-id=952 bgcolor=#E9E9E9
| 289952 ||  || — || July 6, 2005 || Kitt Peak || Spacewatch || WIT || align=right | 1.0 km || 
|-id=953 bgcolor=#d6d6d6
| 289953 ||  || — || July 13, 2005 || Mayhill || A. Lowe || — || align=right | 2.5 km || 
|-id=954 bgcolor=#E9E9E9
| 289954 ||  || — || July 1, 2005 || Kitt Peak || Spacewatch || — || align=right | 3.0 km || 
|-id=955 bgcolor=#fefefe
| 289955 ||  || — || July 3, 2005 || Mount Lemmon || Mount Lemmon Survey || — || align=right data-sort-value="0.98" | 980 m || 
|-id=956 bgcolor=#E9E9E9
| 289956 ||  || — || July 3, 2005 || Mount Lemmon || Mount Lemmon Survey || — || align=right | 2.1 km || 
|-id=957 bgcolor=#E9E9E9
| 289957 ||  || — || July 3, 2005 || Palomar || NEAT || — || align=right | 1.9 km || 
|-id=958 bgcolor=#E9E9E9
| 289958 ||  || — || July 4, 2005 || Palomar || NEAT || GEF || align=right | 1.8 km || 
|-id=959 bgcolor=#E9E9E9
| 289959 ||  || — || July 10, 2005 || Kitt Peak || Spacewatch || — || align=right | 1.7 km || 
|-id=960 bgcolor=#d6d6d6
| 289960 ||  || — || July 10, 2005 || Kitt Peak || Spacewatch || — || align=right | 4.2 km || 
|-id=961 bgcolor=#d6d6d6
| 289961 ||  || — || July 12, 2005 || Mount Lemmon || Mount Lemmon Survey || KOR || align=right | 1.3 km || 
|-id=962 bgcolor=#E9E9E9
| 289962 ||  || — || July 12, 2005 || Mount Lemmon || Mount Lemmon Survey || HEN || align=right | 1.2 km || 
|-id=963 bgcolor=#fefefe
| 289963 ||  || — || July 15, 2005 || Mount Lemmon || Mount Lemmon Survey || NYS || align=right data-sort-value="0.72" | 720 m || 
|-id=964 bgcolor=#E9E9E9
| 289964 ||  || — || July 1, 2005 || Kitt Peak || Spacewatch || — || align=right | 2.9 km || 
|-id=965 bgcolor=#fefefe
| 289965 ||  || — || July 2, 2005 || Kitt Peak || Spacewatch || — || align=right | 1.3 km || 
|-id=966 bgcolor=#d6d6d6
| 289966 ||  || — || July 5, 2005 || Kitt Peak || Spacewatch || — || align=right | 3.6 km || 
|-id=967 bgcolor=#d6d6d6
| 289967 ||  || — || July 5, 2005 || Kitt Peak || Spacewatch || — || align=right | 3.2 km || 
|-id=968 bgcolor=#d6d6d6
| 289968 ||  || — || July 6, 2005 || Kitt Peak || Spacewatch || — || align=right | 4.5 km || 
|-id=969 bgcolor=#E9E9E9
| 289969 ||  || — || July 7, 2005 || Kitt Peak || Spacewatch || — || align=right | 1.6 km || 
|-id=970 bgcolor=#E9E9E9
| 289970 ||  || — || July 12, 2005 || Mount Lemmon || Mount Lemmon Survey || AST || align=right | 1.8 km || 
|-id=971 bgcolor=#fefefe
| 289971 ||  || — || July 15, 2005 || Mount Lemmon || Mount Lemmon Survey || V || align=right data-sort-value="0.95" | 950 m || 
|-id=972 bgcolor=#E9E9E9
| 289972 ||  || — || July 7, 2005 || Mauna Kea || C. Veillet || HEN || align=right data-sort-value="0.94" | 940 m || 
|-id=973 bgcolor=#E9E9E9
| 289973 ||  || — || July 7, 2005 || Mauna Kea || C. Veillet || — || align=right | 1.9 km || 
|-id=974 bgcolor=#E9E9E9
| 289974 ||  || — || July 7, 2005 || Mauna Kea || C. Veillet || — || align=right data-sort-value="0.79" | 790 m || 
|-id=975 bgcolor=#E9E9E9
| 289975 ||  || — || July 9, 2005 || Kitt Peak || Spacewatch || — || align=right | 2.1 km || 
|-id=976 bgcolor=#E9E9E9
| 289976 ||  || — || July 4, 2005 || Palomar || NEAT || — || align=right | 1.3 km || 
|-id=977 bgcolor=#fefefe
| 289977 ||  || — || July 12, 2005 || Kitt Peak || Spacewatch || — || align=right data-sort-value="0.94" | 940 m || 
|-id=978 bgcolor=#d6d6d6
| 289978 ||  || — || July 18, 2005 || Siding Spring || SSS || EUP || align=right | 6.5 km || 
|-id=979 bgcolor=#fefefe
| 289979 ||  || — || July 28, 2005 || Palomar || NEAT || V || align=right data-sort-value="0.85" | 850 m || 
|-id=980 bgcolor=#fefefe
| 289980 ||  || — || July 29, 2005 || Socorro || LINEAR || H || align=right data-sort-value="0.94" | 940 m || 
|-id=981 bgcolor=#E9E9E9
| 289981 ||  || — || July 29, 2005 || Palomar || NEAT || — || align=right | 1.2 km || 
|-id=982 bgcolor=#d6d6d6
| 289982 ||  || — || July 27, 2005 || Palomar || NEAT || — || align=right | 4.8 km || 
|-id=983 bgcolor=#E9E9E9
| 289983 ||  || — || July 28, 2005 || Palomar || NEAT || — || align=right | 2.5 km || 
|-id=984 bgcolor=#E9E9E9
| 289984 ||  || — || July 30, 2005 || Palomar || NEAT || — || align=right | 2.4 km || 
|-id=985 bgcolor=#E9E9E9
| 289985 ||  || — || July 30, 2005 || Palomar || NEAT || — || align=right | 1.7 km || 
|-id=986 bgcolor=#d6d6d6
| 289986 ||  || — || July 30, 2005 || Palomar || NEAT || — || align=right | 4.3 km || 
|-id=987 bgcolor=#d6d6d6
| 289987 ||  || — || July 30, 2005 || Palomar || NEAT || — || align=right | 4.7 km || 
|-id=988 bgcolor=#fefefe
| 289988 ||  || — || July 31, 2005 || Palomar || NEAT || — || align=right | 1.0 km || 
|-id=989 bgcolor=#E9E9E9
| 289989 ||  || — || July 31, 2005 || Palomar || NEAT || — || align=right | 2.8 km || 
|-id=990 bgcolor=#d6d6d6
| 289990 ||  || — || July 30, 2005 || Palomar || NEAT || — || align=right | 5.8 km || 
|-id=991 bgcolor=#d6d6d6
| 289991 ||  || — || August 1, 2005 || Siding Spring || SSS || — || align=right | 4.1 km || 
|-id=992 bgcolor=#d6d6d6
| 289992 Onfray ||  ||  || August 10, 2005 || Saint-Sulpice || Saint-Sulpice Obs. || — || align=right | 2.5 km || 
|-id=993 bgcolor=#d6d6d6
| 289993 ||  || — || August 4, 2005 || Palomar || NEAT || — || align=right | 4.4 km || 
|-id=994 bgcolor=#fefefe
| 289994 ||  || — || August 1, 2005 || Siding Spring || SSS || — || align=right data-sort-value="0.97" | 970 m || 
|-id=995 bgcolor=#d6d6d6
| 289995 ||  || — || August 4, 2005 || Palomar || NEAT || — || align=right | 3.4 km || 
|-id=996 bgcolor=#d6d6d6
| 289996 ||  || — || August 4, 2005 || Palomar || NEAT || EOS || align=right | 2.1 km || 
|-id=997 bgcolor=#fefefe
| 289997 ||  || — || August 4, 2005 || Palomar || NEAT || V || align=right data-sort-value="0.77" | 770 m || 
|-id=998 bgcolor=#d6d6d6
| 289998 ||  || — || August 4, 2005 || Palomar || NEAT || — || align=right | 3.9 km || 
|-id=999 bgcolor=#fefefe
| 289999 ||  || — || August 4, 2005 || Palomar || NEAT || — || align=right | 1.0 km || 
|-id=000 bgcolor=#E9E9E9
| 290000 ||  || — || August 4, 2005 || Palomar || NEAT || — || align=right | 2.1 km || 
|}

References

External links 
 Discovery Circumstances: Numbered Minor Planets (285001)–(290000) (IAU Minor Planet Center)

0289